

457001–457100 

|-bgcolor=#fefefe
| 457001 ||  || — || February 7, 2008 || Catalina || CSS || H || align=right data-sort-value="0.77" | 770 m || 
|-id=002 bgcolor=#E9E9E9
| 457002 ||  || — || December 19, 2007 || Mount Lemmon || Mount Lemmon Survey || — || align=right data-sort-value="0.94" | 940 m || 
|-id=003 bgcolor=#fefefe
| 457003 ||  || — || February 6, 2008 || Catalina || CSS || H || align=right data-sort-value="0.76" | 760 m || 
|-id=004 bgcolor=#d6d6d6
| 457004 ||  || — || February 6, 2008 || Catalina || CSS || 3:2 || align=right | 7.2 km || 
|-id=005 bgcolor=#fefefe
| 457005 ||  || — || January 14, 2008 || Kitt Peak || Spacewatch || H || align=right data-sort-value="0.67" | 670 m || 
|-id=006 bgcolor=#fefefe
| 457006 ||  || — || February 7, 2008 || Kitt Peak || Spacewatch || — || align=right data-sort-value="0.98" | 980 m || 
|-id=007 bgcolor=#E9E9E9
| 457007 ||  || — || February 7, 2008 || Kitt Peak || Spacewatch || — || align=right | 1.2 km || 
|-id=008 bgcolor=#fefefe
| 457008 ||  || — || February 7, 2008 || Kitt Peak || Spacewatch || V || align=right data-sort-value="0.70" | 700 m || 
|-id=009 bgcolor=#fefefe
| 457009 ||  || — || February 7, 2008 || Mount Lemmon || Mount Lemmon Survey || — || align=right | 2.8 km || 
|-id=010 bgcolor=#E9E9E9
| 457010 ||  || — || February 7, 2008 || Mount Lemmon || Mount Lemmon Survey || — || align=right data-sort-value="0.99" | 990 m || 
|-id=011 bgcolor=#E9E9E9
| 457011 ||  || — || February 8, 2008 || Kitt Peak || Spacewatch || — || align=right data-sort-value="0.70" | 700 m || 
|-id=012 bgcolor=#fefefe
| 457012 ||  || — || February 8, 2008 || Kitt Peak || Spacewatch || H || align=right data-sort-value="0.72" | 720 m || 
|-id=013 bgcolor=#E9E9E9
| 457013 ||  || — || March 15, 2004 || Kitt Peak || Spacewatch || — || align=right data-sort-value="0.65" | 650 m || 
|-id=014 bgcolor=#E9E9E9
| 457014 ||  || — || February 10, 2008 || Catalina || CSS || — || align=right | 1.2 km || 
|-id=015 bgcolor=#E9E9E9
| 457015 ||  || — || January 1, 2008 || Mount Lemmon || Mount Lemmon Survey || — || align=right | 1.1 km || 
|-id=016 bgcolor=#fefefe
| 457016 ||  || — || February 7, 2008 || Mount Lemmon || Mount Lemmon Survey || H || align=right data-sort-value="0.79" | 790 m || 
|-id=017 bgcolor=#fefefe
| 457017 ||  || — || February 6, 2008 || Catalina || CSS || H || align=right data-sort-value="0.77" | 770 m || 
|-id=018 bgcolor=#fefefe
| 457018 ||  || — || February 6, 2008 || Catalina || CSS || H || align=right data-sort-value="0.56" | 560 m || 
|-id=019 bgcolor=#E9E9E9
| 457019 ||  || — || February 7, 2008 || Mount Lemmon || Mount Lemmon Survey || — || align=right data-sort-value="0.59" | 590 m || 
|-id=020 bgcolor=#E9E9E9
| 457020 ||  || — || January 20, 2008 || Mount Lemmon || Mount Lemmon Survey || EUN || align=right | 1.4 km || 
|-id=021 bgcolor=#E9E9E9
| 457021 ||  || — || December 30, 2007 || Mount Lemmon || Mount Lemmon Survey || MAR || align=right | 1.2 km || 
|-id=022 bgcolor=#E9E9E9
| 457022 ||  || — || February 8, 2008 || Kitt Peak || Spacewatch || EUN || align=right data-sort-value="0.81" | 810 m || 
|-id=023 bgcolor=#E9E9E9
| 457023 ||  || — || February 8, 2008 || Kitt Peak || Spacewatch || (194) || align=right data-sort-value="0.90" | 900 m || 
|-id=024 bgcolor=#E9E9E9
| 457024 ||  || — || February 8, 2008 || Kitt Peak || Spacewatch || — || align=right | 1.3 km || 
|-id=025 bgcolor=#E9E9E9
| 457025 ||  || — || February 9, 2008 || Kitt Peak || Spacewatch || — || align=right | 1.0 km || 
|-id=026 bgcolor=#E9E9E9
| 457026 ||  || — || February 9, 2008 || Kitt Peak || Spacewatch || — || align=right | 1.1 km || 
|-id=027 bgcolor=#E9E9E9
| 457027 ||  || — || November 20, 2007 || Mount Lemmon || Mount Lemmon Survey || — || align=right | 1.3 km || 
|-id=028 bgcolor=#E9E9E9
| 457028 ||  || — || January 15, 2008 || Mount Lemmon || Mount Lemmon Survey || — || align=right data-sort-value="0.85" | 850 m || 
|-id=029 bgcolor=#E9E9E9
| 457029 ||  || — || February 9, 2008 || Catalina || CSS || — || align=right data-sort-value="0.69" | 690 m || 
|-id=030 bgcolor=#E9E9E9
| 457030 ||  || — || February 9, 2008 || Kitt Peak || Spacewatch || — || align=right data-sort-value="0.69" | 690 m || 
|-id=031 bgcolor=#E9E9E9
| 457031 ||  || — || February 1, 2008 || Mount Lemmon || Mount Lemmon Survey || — || align=right | 1.4 km || 
|-id=032 bgcolor=#E9E9E9
| 457032 ||  || — || February 12, 2008 || Mount Lemmon || Mount Lemmon Survey || — || align=right | 1.0 km || 
|-id=033 bgcolor=#E9E9E9
| 457033 ||  || — || February 13, 2008 || Kitt Peak || Spacewatch || EUN || align=right | 1.2 km || 
|-id=034 bgcolor=#fefefe
| 457034 ||  || — || February 6, 2008 || Catalina || CSS || H || align=right data-sort-value="0.72" | 720 m || 
|-id=035 bgcolor=#fefefe
| 457035 ||  || — || February 13, 2008 || Anderson Mesa || LONEOS || H || align=right data-sort-value="0.85" | 850 m || 
|-id=036 bgcolor=#E9E9E9
| 457036 ||  || — || February 2, 2008 || Catalina || CSS || — || align=right | 2.5 km || 
|-id=037 bgcolor=#E9E9E9
| 457037 ||  || — || February 2, 2008 || Kitt Peak || Spacewatch || — || align=right data-sort-value="0.67" | 670 m || 
|-id=038 bgcolor=#E9E9E9
| 457038 ||  || — || February 8, 2008 || Kitt Peak || Spacewatch || — || align=right | 1.1 km || 
|-id=039 bgcolor=#E9E9E9
| 457039 ||  || — || February 7, 2008 || Kitt Peak || Spacewatch || — || align=right data-sort-value="0.61" | 610 m || 
|-id=040 bgcolor=#E9E9E9
| 457040 ||  || — || February 13, 2008 || Mount Lemmon || Mount Lemmon Survey || — || align=right | 1.1 km || 
|-id=041 bgcolor=#E9E9E9
| 457041 ||  || — || February 9, 2008 || Mount Lemmon || Mount Lemmon Survey || — || align=right | 2.3 km || 
|-id=042 bgcolor=#E9E9E9
| 457042 ||  || — || February 12, 2008 || Kitt Peak || Spacewatch || — || align=right data-sort-value="0.77" | 770 m || 
|-id=043 bgcolor=#E9E9E9
| 457043 ||  || — || February 12, 2008 || Kitt Peak || Spacewatch || — || align=right data-sort-value="0.64" | 640 m || 
|-id=044 bgcolor=#fefefe
| 457044 ||  || — || December 31, 2007 || Kitt Peak || Spacewatch || — || align=right data-sort-value="0.96" | 960 m || 
|-id=045 bgcolor=#E9E9E9
| 457045 ||  || — || February 12, 2008 || Mount Lemmon || Mount Lemmon Survey || — || align=right | 1.4 km || 
|-id=046 bgcolor=#E9E9E9
| 457046 ||  || — || February 18, 2008 || Mount Lemmon || Mount Lemmon Survey || — || align=right | 1.1 km || 
|-id=047 bgcolor=#E9E9E9
| 457047 ||  || — || January 10, 2008 || Mount Lemmon || Mount Lemmon Survey || — || align=right | 1.4 km || 
|-id=048 bgcolor=#E9E9E9
| 457048 ||  || — || January 11, 2008 || Kitt Peak || Spacewatch || — || align=right data-sort-value="0.72" | 720 m || 
|-id=049 bgcolor=#E9E9E9
| 457049 ||  || — || February 24, 2008 || Kitt Peak || Spacewatch || — || align=right | 1.5 km || 
|-id=050 bgcolor=#E9E9E9
| 457050 ||  || — || February 28, 2008 || Mount Lemmon || Mount Lemmon Survey || (5) || align=right data-sort-value="0.66" | 660 m || 
|-id=051 bgcolor=#E9E9E9
| 457051 ||  || — || February 29, 2008 || Mount Lemmon || Mount Lemmon Survey || — || align=right | 1.4 km || 
|-id=052 bgcolor=#E9E9E9
| 457052 ||  || — || January 10, 2008 || Mount Lemmon || Mount Lemmon Survey || — || align=right data-sort-value="0.82" | 820 m || 
|-id=053 bgcolor=#fefefe
| 457053 ||  || — || February 29, 2008 || Catalina || CSS || H || align=right data-sort-value="0.86" | 860 m || 
|-id=054 bgcolor=#E9E9E9
| 457054 ||  || — || February 29, 2008 || Mount Lemmon || Mount Lemmon Survey || — || align=right data-sort-value="0.90" | 900 m || 
|-id=055 bgcolor=#E9E9E9
| 457055 ||  || — || February 29, 2008 || Kitt Peak || Spacewatch || — || align=right | 1.7 km || 
|-id=056 bgcolor=#E9E9E9
| 457056 ||  || — || January 9, 2008 || Mount Lemmon || Mount Lemmon Survey || — || align=right data-sort-value="0.90" | 900 m || 
|-id=057 bgcolor=#E9E9E9
| 457057 ||  || — || February 27, 2008 || Kitt Peak || Spacewatch || — || align=right | 1.7 km || 
|-id=058 bgcolor=#E9E9E9
| 457058 ||  || — || February 28, 2008 || Mount Lemmon || Mount Lemmon Survey || — || align=right data-sort-value="0.94" | 940 m || 
|-id=059 bgcolor=#FFC2E0
| 457059 ||  || — || March 1, 2008 || Catalina || CSS || ATE || align=right data-sort-value="0.35" | 350 m || 
|-id=060 bgcolor=#E9E9E9
| 457060 ||  || — || February 18, 2008 || Mount Lemmon || Mount Lemmon Survey || — || align=right | 1.6 km || 
|-id=061 bgcolor=#E9E9E9
| 457061 ||  || — || March 2, 2008 || Kitt Peak || Spacewatch || EUN || align=right | 1.1 km || 
|-id=062 bgcolor=#E9E9E9
| 457062 ||  || — || February 18, 2008 || Mount Lemmon || Mount Lemmon Survey || — || align=right | 2.5 km || 
|-id=063 bgcolor=#fefefe
| 457063 ||  || — || November 21, 2007 || Mount Lemmon || Mount Lemmon Survey || H || align=right data-sort-value="0.60" | 600 m || 
|-id=064 bgcolor=#E9E9E9
| 457064 ||  || — || March 5, 2008 || Kitt Peak || Spacewatch || MAR || align=right | 1.1 km || 
|-id=065 bgcolor=#E9E9E9
| 457065 ||  || — || February 2, 2008 || Mount Lemmon || Mount Lemmon Survey || — || align=right data-sort-value="0.75" | 750 m || 
|-id=066 bgcolor=#E9E9E9
| 457066 ||  || — || March 5, 2008 || Kitt Peak || Spacewatch || — || align=right data-sort-value="0.94" | 940 m || 
|-id=067 bgcolor=#E9E9E9
| 457067 ||  || — || March 5, 2008 || Mount Lemmon || Mount Lemmon Survey || — || align=right | 1.6 km || 
|-id=068 bgcolor=#E9E9E9
| 457068 ||  || — || February 27, 2008 || Kitt Peak || Spacewatch || — || align=right data-sort-value="0.95" | 950 m || 
|-id=069 bgcolor=#E9E9E9
| 457069 ||  || — || March 6, 2008 || Mount Lemmon || Mount Lemmon Survey || — || align=right data-sort-value="0.98" | 980 m || 
|-id=070 bgcolor=#E9E9E9
| 457070 ||  || — || March 6, 2008 || Mount Lemmon || Mount Lemmon Survey || — || align=right data-sort-value="0.91" | 910 m || 
|-id=071 bgcolor=#E9E9E9
| 457071 ||  || — || February 28, 2008 || Kitt Peak || Spacewatch || — || align=right data-sort-value="0.90" | 900 m || 
|-id=072 bgcolor=#E9E9E9
| 457072 ||  || — || March 9, 2008 || Mount Lemmon || Mount Lemmon Survey || — || align=right | 1.3 km || 
|-id=073 bgcolor=#fefefe
| 457073 ||  || — || March 11, 2008 || Catalina || CSS || H || align=right data-sort-value="0.56" | 560 m || 
|-id=074 bgcolor=#E9E9E9
| 457074 ||  || — || March 6, 2008 || Kleť || Kleť Obs. || — || align=right data-sort-value="0.93" | 930 m || 
|-id=075 bgcolor=#E9E9E9
| 457075 ||  || — || March 6, 2008 || Mount Lemmon || Mount Lemmon Survey || EUN || align=right | 1.1 km || 
|-id=076 bgcolor=#E9E9E9
| 457076 ||  || — || February 28, 2008 || Kitt Peak || Spacewatch || — || align=right data-sort-value="0.82" | 820 m || 
|-id=077 bgcolor=#E9E9E9
| 457077 ||  || — || February 9, 2008 || Catalina || CSS || — || align=right | 1.4 km || 
|-id=078 bgcolor=#E9E9E9
| 457078 ||  || — || February 11, 2008 || Mount Lemmon || Mount Lemmon Survey || — || align=right | 1.8 km || 
|-id=079 bgcolor=#E9E9E9
| 457079 ||  || — || March 3, 2008 || Catalina || CSS || EUN || align=right | 1.3 km || 
|-id=080 bgcolor=#E9E9E9
| 457080 ||  || — || March 6, 2008 || Mount Lemmon || Mount Lemmon Survey || — || align=right | 1.1 km || 
|-id=081 bgcolor=#E9E9E9
| 457081 ||  || — || March 4, 2008 || Catalina || CSS || — || align=right | 1.0 km || 
|-id=082 bgcolor=#fefefe
| 457082 ||  || — || March 3, 2008 || Kitt Peak || Spacewatch || H || align=right data-sort-value="0.63" | 630 m || 
|-id=083 bgcolor=#E9E9E9
| 457083 ||  || — || March 6, 2008 || Mount Lemmon || Mount Lemmon Survey || — || align=right | 1.5 km || 
|-id=084 bgcolor=#E9E9E9
| 457084 ||  || — || March 8, 2008 || Kitt Peak || Spacewatch || — || align=right | 1.5 km || 
|-id=085 bgcolor=#E9E9E9
| 457085 ||  || — || March 8, 2008 || Kitt Peak || Spacewatch || — || align=right data-sort-value="0.89" | 890 m || 
|-id=086 bgcolor=#E9E9E9
| 457086 ||  || — || February 2, 2008 || Mount Lemmon || Mount Lemmon Survey || — || align=right | 1.6 km || 
|-id=087 bgcolor=#E9E9E9
| 457087 ||  || — || January 30, 2008 || Mount Lemmon || Mount Lemmon Survey || — || align=right data-sort-value="0.70" | 700 m || 
|-id=088 bgcolor=#E9E9E9
| 457088 ||  || — || February 28, 2008 || Kitt Peak || Spacewatch || — || align=right | 1.4 km || 
|-id=089 bgcolor=#E9E9E9
| 457089 ||  || — || January 30, 2008 || Mount Lemmon || Mount Lemmon Survey || — || align=right | 1.3 km || 
|-id=090 bgcolor=#E9E9E9
| 457090 ||  || — || January 11, 2008 || Kitt Peak || Spacewatch || — || align=right data-sort-value="0.77" | 770 m || 
|-id=091 bgcolor=#E9E9E9
| 457091 ||  || — || March 10, 2008 || Mount Lemmon || Mount Lemmon Survey || — || align=right data-sort-value="0.86" | 860 m || 
|-id=092 bgcolor=#E9E9E9
| 457092 ||  || — || March 10, 2008 || Kitt Peak || Spacewatch || — || align=right | 1.2 km || 
|-id=093 bgcolor=#E9E9E9
| 457093 ||  || — || March 11, 2008 || Kitt Peak || Spacewatch || — || align=right data-sort-value="0.65" | 650 m || 
|-id=094 bgcolor=#E9E9E9
| 457094 ||  || — || February 28, 2008 || Kitt Peak || Spacewatch || (5) || align=right data-sort-value="0.66" | 660 m || 
|-id=095 bgcolor=#E9E9E9
| 457095 ||  || — || April 19, 2004 || Kitt Peak || Spacewatch || — || align=right | 1.2 km || 
|-id=096 bgcolor=#E9E9E9
| 457096 ||  || — || February 28, 2008 || Kitt Peak || Spacewatch || — || align=right | 1.0 km || 
|-id=097 bgcolor=#E9E9E9
| 457097 ||  || — || February 24, 2008 || Kitt Peak || Spacewatch || — || align=right data-sort-value="0.85" | 850 m || 
|-id=098 bgcolor=#E9E9E9
| 457098 ||  || — || March 7, 2008 || Nyukasa || Mount Nyukasa Stn. || — || align=right data-sort-value="0.89" | 890 m || 
|-id=099 bgcolor=#E9E9E9
| 457099 ||  || — || March 1, 2008 || Kitt Peak || Spacewatch || — || align=right | 1.5 km || 
|-id=100 bgcolor=#E9E9E9
| 457100 ||  || — || March 8, 2008 || Kitt Peak || Spacewatch || — || align=right | 1.4 km || 
|}

457101–457200 

|-bgcolor=#E9E9E9
| 457101 ||  || — || March 10, 2008 || Kitt Peak || Spacewatch || — || align=right | 1.3 km || 
|-id=102 bgcolor=#E9E9E9
| 457102 ||  || — || March 15, 2008 || Mount Lemmon || Mount Lemmon Survey || — || align=right | 1.2 km || 
|-id=103 bgcolor=#E9E9E9
| 457103 ||  || — || March 1, 2008 || Kitt Peak || Spacewatch || EUN || align=right data-sort-value="0.99" | 990 m || 
|-id=104 bgcolor=#E9E9E9
| 457104 ||  || — || March 1, 2008 || Kitt Peak || Spacewatch || critical || align=right | 1.3 km || 
|-id=105 bgcolor=#E9E9E9
| 457105 ||  || — || March 1, 2008 || Kitt Peak || Spacewatch || CLO || align=right | 2.2 km || 
|-id=106 bgcolor=#fefefe
| 457106 ||  || — || March 8, 2008 || Catalina || CSS || H || align=right data-sort-value="0.84" | 840 m || 
|-id=107 bgcolor=#E9E9E9
| 457107 ||  || — || March 12, 2008 || Kitt Peak || Spacewatch || critical || align=right | 1.2 km || 
|-id=108 bgcolor=#E9E9E9
| 457108 ||  || — || February 8, 2008 || Mount Lemmon || Mount Lemmon Survey || — || align=right data-sort-value="0.85" | 850 m || 
|-id=109 bgcolor=#E9E9E9
| 457109 ||  || — || February 8, 2008 || Kitt Peak || Spacewatch || — || align=right data-sort-value="0.94" | 940 m || 
|-id=110 bgcolor=#E9E9E9
| 457110 ||  || — || February 11, 2008 || Kitt Peak || Spacewatch || — || align=right data-sort-value="0.69" | 690 m || 
|-id=111 bgcolor=#fefefe
| 457111 ||  || — || March 1, 2008 || Kitt Peak || Spacewatch || MAS || align=right data-sort-value="0.60" | 600 m || 
|-id=112 bgcolor=#E9E9E9
| 457112 ||  || — || March 26, 2008 || Mount Lemmon || Mount Lemmon Survey || — || align=right data-sort-value="0.80" | 800 m || 
|-id=113 bgcolor=#E9E9E9
| 457113 ||  || — || March 26, 2008 || Mount Lemmon || Mount Lemmon Survey || — || align=right data-sort-value="0.76" | 760 m || 
|-id=114 bgcolor=#E9E9E9
| 457114 ||  || — || March 26, 2008 || Kitt Peak || Spacewatch || RAF || align=right data-sort-value="0.80" | 800 m || 
|-id=115 bgcolor=#E9E9E9
| 457115 ||  || — || February 10, 2008 || Kitt Peak || Spacewatch || — || align=right | 1.5 km || 
|-id=116 bgcolor=#E9E9E9
| 457116 ||  || — || October 21, 2006 || Mount Lemmon || Mount Lemmon Survey || — || align=right | 1.3 km || 
|-id=117 bgcolor=#E9E9E9
| 457117 ||  || — || March 27, 2008 || Kitt Peak || Spacewatch || — || align=right | 1.2 km || 
|-id=118 bgcolor=#E9E9E9
| 457118 ||  || — || March 27, 2008 || Kitt Peak || Spacewatch || JUN || align=right data-sort-value="0.97" | 970 m || 
|-id=119 bgcolor=#E9E9E9
| 457119 ||  || — || March 27, 2008 || Kitt Peak || Spacewatch || — || align=right | 1.1 km || 
|-id=120 bgcolor=#E9E9E9
| 457120 ||  || — || January 30, 2008 || Mount Lemmon || Mount Lemmon Survey || RAF || align=right data-sort-value="0.68" | 680 m || 
|-id=121 bgcolor=#E9E9E9
| 457121 ||  || — || March 28, 2008 || Mount Lemmon || Mount Lemmon Survey || — || align=right data-sort-value="0.63" | 630 m || 
|-id=122 bgcolor=#E9E9E9
| 457122 ||  || — || March 28, 2008 || Kitt Peak || Spacewatch || — || align=right | 1.3 km || 
|-id=123 bgcolor=#E9E9E9
| 457123 ||  || — || March 28, 2008 || Mount Lemmon || Mount Lemmon Survey || — || align=right | 1.0 km || 
|-id=124 bgcolor=#E9E9E9
| 457124 ||  || — || August 28, 2005 || Kitt Peak || Spacewatch || — || align=right | 1.3 km || 
|-id=125 bgcolor=#E9E9E9
| 457125 ||  || — || February 29, 2008 || Kitt Peak || Spacewatch || — || align=right | 1.6 km || 
|-id=126 bgcolor=#E9E9E9
| 457126 ||  || — || September 24, 2005 || Kitt Peak || Spacewatch || — || align=right | 1.2 km || 
|-id=127 bgcolor=#E9E9E9
| 457127 ||  || — || March 28, 2008 || Kitt Peak || Spacewatch || — || align=right | 2.3 km || 
|-id=128 bgcolor=#E9E9E9
| 457128 ||  || — || March 28, 2008 || Mount Lemmon || Mount Lemmon Survey || — || align=right | 1.4 km || 
|-id=129 bgcolor=#E9E9E9
| 457129 ||  || — || March 10, 2008 || Mount Lemmon || Mount Lemmon Survey || — || align=right data-sort-value="0.75" | 750 m || 
|-id=130 bgcolor=#E9E9E9
| 457130 ||  || — || March 28, 2008 || Kitt Peak || Spacewatch || critical || align=right | 1.1 km || 
|-id=131 bgcolor=#fefefe
| 457131 ||  || — || March 28, 2008 || Mount Lemmon || Mount Lemmon Survey || H || align=right data-sort-value="0.76" | 760 m || 
|-id=132 bgcolor=#E9E9E9
| 457132 ||  || — || March 29, 2008 || Mount Lemmon || Mount Lemmon Survey || — || align=right | 1.3 km || 
|-id=133 bgcolor=#E9E9E9
| 457133 ||  || — || March 31, 2008 || Mount Lemmon || Mount Lemmon Survey || — || align=right data-sort-value="0.89" | 890 m || 
|-id=134 bgcolor=#E9E9E9
| 457134 ||  || — || March 1, 2008 || Kitt Peak || Spacewatch || MIS || align=right | 2.6 km || 
|-id=135 bgcolor=#E9E9E9
| 457135 ||  || — || March 27, 2008 || Mount Lemmon || Mount Lemmon Survey || — || align=right | 1.7 km || 
|-id=136 bgcolor=#E9E9E9
| 457136 ||  || — || March 28, 2008 || Mount Lemmon || Mount Lemmon Survey || EUN || align=right | 1.0 km || 
|-id=137 bgcolor=#E9E9E9
| 457137 ||  || — || March 29, 2008 || Mount Lemmon || Mount Lemmon Survey || — || align=right data-sort-value="0.96" | 960 m || 
|-id=138 bgcolor=#E9E9E9
| 457138 ||  || — || March 29, 2008 || Kitt Peak || Spacewatch || — || align=right | 1.2 km || 
|-id=139 bgcolor=#E9E9E9
| 457139 ||  || — || March 30, 2008 || Kitt Peak || Spacewatch || — || align=right | 1.3 km || 
|-id=140 bgcolor=#E9E9E9
| 457140 ||  || — || March 30, 2008 || Kitt Peak || Spacewatch || — || align=right | 1.2 km || 
|-id=141 bgcolor=#E9E9E9
| 457141 ||  || — || March 30, 2008 || Kitt Peak || Spacewatch || — || align=right | 1.2 km || 
|-id=142 bgcolor=#fefefe
| 457142 ||  || — || March 31, 2008 || Mount Lemmon || Mount Lemmon Survey || H || align=right data-sort-value="0.68" | 680 m || 
|-id=143 bgcolor=#E9E9E9
| 457143 ||  || — || March 27, 2008 || Mount Lemmon || Mount Lemmon Survey || — || align=right | 1.8 km || 
|-id=144 bgcolor=#E9E9E9
| 457144 ||  || — || March 29, 2008 || Kitt Peak || Spacewatch || — || align=right | 2.0 km || 
|-id=145 bgcolor=#E9E9E9
| 457145 ||  || — || March 31, 2008 || Mount Lemmon || Mount Lemmon Survey || JUN || align=right | 1.1 km || 
|-id=146 bgcolor=#E9E9E9
| 457146 ||  || — || March 28, 2008 || Kitt Peak || Spacewatch || — || align=right | 1.2 km || 
|-id=147 bgcolor=#E9E9E9
| 457147 ||  || — || March 28, 2008 || Kitt Peak || Spacewatch || — || align=right data-sort-value="0.70" | 700 m || 
|-id=148 bgcolor=#E9E9E9
| 457148 ||  || — || March 30, 2008 || Catalina || CSS || — || align=right | 1.4 km || 
|-id=149 bgcolor=#E9E9E9
| 457149 ||  || — || March 30, 2008 || Kitt Peak || Spacewatch || MIS || align=right | 1.8 km || 
|-id=150 bgcolor=#C2FFFF
| 457150 ||  || — || March 30, 2008 || Kitt Peak || Spacewatch || L5 || align=right | 11 km || 
|-id=151 bgcolor=#E9E9E9
| 457151 ||  || — || May 20, 2004 || Campo Imperatore || CINEOS || (5) || align=right data-sort-value="0.89" | 890 m || 
|-id=152 bgcolor=#E9E9E9
| 457152 ||  || — || March 28, 2008 || Mount Lemmon || Mount Lemmon Survey || — || align=right data-sort-value="0.99" | 990 m || 
|-id=153 bgcolor=#E9E9E9
| 457153 ||  || — || March 30, 2008 || Kitt Peak || Spacewatch || MIS || align=right | 2.1 km || 
|-id=154 bgcolor=#E9E9E9
| 457154 ||  || — || March 29, 2008 || Catalina || CSS || fast? || align=right | 3.2 km || 
|-id=155 bgcolor=#E9E9E9
| 457155 || 2008 GU || — || April 3, 2008 || Socorro || LINEAR || — || align=right | 1.2 km || 
|-id=156 bgcolor=#E9E9E9
| 457156 ||  || — || February 2, 2008 || Kitt Peak || Spacewatch || — || align=right data-sort-value="0.88" | 880 m || 
|-id=157 bgcolor=#E9E9E9
| 457157 ||  || — || April 1, 2008 || Kitt Peak || Spacewatch || — || align=right | 1.4 km || 
|-id=158 bgcolor=#E9E9E9
| 457158 ||  || — || April 1, 2008 || Kitt Peak || Spacewatch || — || align=right | 2.4 km || 
|-id=159 bgcolor=#E9E9E9
| 457159 ||  || — || April 1, 2008 || Kitt Peak || Spacewatch || — || align=right | 2.7 km || 
|-id=160 bgcolor=#E9E9E9
| 457160 ||  || — || April 3, 2008 || Mount Lemmon || Mount Lemmon Survey || — || align=right | 1.5 km || 
|-id=161 bgcolor=#E9E9E9
| 457161 ||  || — || March 27, 2008 || Mount Lemmon || Mount Lemmon Survey || — || align=right | 1.4 km || 
|-id=162 bgcolor=#E9E9E9
| 457162 ||  || — || April 3, 2008 || Mount Lemmon || Mount Lemmon Survey || — || align=right data-sort-value="0.86" | 860 m || 
|-id=163 bgcolor=#E9E9E9
| 457163 ||  || — || April 3, 2008 || Mount Lemmon || Mount Lemmon Survey || — || align=right | 1.4 km || 
|-id=164 bgcolor=#E9E9E9
| 457164 ||  || — || April 4, 2008 || Kitt Peak || Spacewatch || — || align=right | 1.8 km || 
|-id=165 bgcolor=#E9E9E9
| 457165 ||  || — || February 9, 2008 || Mount Lemmon || Mount Lemmon Survey || — || align=right | 1.3 km || 
|-id=166 bgcolor=#E9E9E9
| 457166 ||  || — || March 28, 2008 || Kitt Peak || Spacewatch || — || align=right | 1.3 km || 
|-id=167 bgcolor=#E9E9E9
| 457167 ||  || — || April 6, 2008 || Mount Lemmon || Mount Lemmon Survey || — || align=right | 1.3 km || 
|-id=168 bgcolor=#E9E9E9
| 457168 ||  || — || April 6, 2008 || Mount Lemmon || Mount Lemmon Survey || — || align=right | 1.5 km || 
|-id=169 bgcolor=#E9E9E9
| 457169 ||  || — || March 29, 2008 || Kitt Peak || Spacewatch || — || align=right data-sort-value="0.94" | 940 m || 
|-id=170 bgcolor=#E9E9E9
| 457170 ||  || — || February 18, 2008 || Mount Lemmon || Mount Lemmon Survey || — || align=right | 1.8 km || 
|-id=171 bgcolor=#E9E9E9
| 457171 ||  || — || March 4, 2008 || Mount Lemmon || Mount Lemmon Survey || — || align=right | 1.3 km || 
|-id=172 bgcolor=#E9E9E9
| 457172 ||  || — || April 7, 2008 || Kitt Peak || Spacewatch || — || align=right | 1.5 km || 
|-id=173 bgcolor=#E9E9E9
| 457173 ||  || — || January 17, 2007 || Mount Lemmon || Mount Lemmon Survey || — || align=right | 2.5 km || 
|-id=174 bgcolor=#E9E9E9
| 457174 ||  || — || March 31, 2008 || Mount Lemmon || Mount Lemmon Survey || — || align=right | 1.2 km || 
|-id=175 bgcolor=#d6d6d6
| 457175 ||  || — || April 8, 2008 || Kitt Peak || Spacewatch || 3:2 || align=right | 15 km || 
|-id=176 bgcolor=#E9E9E9
| 457176 ||  || — || April 9, 2008 || Kitt Peak || Spacewatch || — || align=right data-sort-value="0.97" | 970 m || 
|-id=177 bgcolor=#E9E9E9
| 457177 ||  || — || November 20, 2006 || Kitt Peak || Spacewatch || — || align=right data-sort-value="0.76" | 760 m || 
|-id=178 bgcolor=#E9E9E9
| 457178 ||  || — || April 11, 2008 || Catalina || CSS || — || align=right | 1.7 km || 
|-id=179 bgcolor=#E9E9E9
| 457179 ||  || — || April 3, 2008 || Catalina || CSS || — || align=right | 2.6 km || 
|-id=180 bgcolor=#E9E9E9
| 457180 ||  || — || March 30, 2008 || Kitt Peak || Spacewatch || — || align=right | 1.5 km || 
|-id=181 bgcolor=#E9E9E9
| 457181 ||  || — || April 11, 2008 || Kitt Peak || Spacewatch || — || align=right | 2.1 km || 
|-id=182 bgcolor=#E9E9E9
| 457182 ||  || — || March 30, 2008 || Catalina || CSS || — || align=right | 2.0 km || 
|-id=183 bgcolor=#E9E9E9
| 457183 ||  || — || April 13, 2008 || Mount Lemmon || Mount Lemmon Survey || JUN || align=right | 1.1 km || 
|-id=184 bgcolor=#fefefe
| 457184 ||  || — || April 14, 2008 || Mount Lemmon || Mount Lemmon Survey || H || align=right data-sort-value="0.95" | 950 m || 
|-id=185 bgcolor=#E9E9E9
| 457185 ||  || — || March 11, 2008 || Mount Lemmon || Mount Lemmon Survey || — || align=right data-sort-value="0.83" | 830 m || 
|-id=186 bgcolor=#E9E9E9
| 457186 ||  || — || April 7, 2008 || Kitt Peak || Spacewatch || ADE || align=right | 1.7 km || 
|-id=187 bgcolor=#E9E9E9
| 457187 ||  || — || April 4, 2008 || Kitt Peak || Spacewatch || — || align=right | 2.0 km || 
|-id=188 bgcolor=#E9E9E9
| 457188 ||  || — || February 2, 2008 || Mount Lemmon || Mount Lemmon Survey || — || align=right | 1.5 km || 
|-id=189 bgcolor=#E9E9E9
| 457189 ||  || — || April 3, 2008 || Socorro || LINEAR || — || align=right | 1.8 km || 
|-id=190 bgcolor=#d6d6d6
| 457190 ||  || — || November 10, 2005 || Mount Lemmon || Mount Lemmon Survey || — || align=right | 4.2 km || 
|-id=191 bgcolor=#E9E9E9
| 457191 ||  || — || April 14, 2008 || Catalina || CSS || — || align=right | 1.3 km || 
|-id=192 bgcolor=#E9E9E9
| 457192 ||  || — || February 1, 1995 || Kitt Peak || Spacewatch || — || align=right data-sort-value="0.75" | 750 m || 
|-id=193 bgcolor=#E9E9E9
| 457193 ||  || — || April 4, 2008 || Catalina || CSS || — || align=right | 1.3 km || 
|-id=194 bgcolor=#E9E9E9
| 457194 ||  || — || April 25, 2008 || Kitt Peak || Spacewatch || KON || align=right | 2.0 km || 
|-id=195 bgcolor=#E9E9E9
| 457195 ||  || — || April 25, 2008 || Catalina || CSS || — || align=right | 1.1 km || 
|-id=196 bgcolor=#E9E9E9
| 457196 ||  || — || April 15, 2008 || Mount Lemmon || Mount Lemmon Survey || — || align=right data-sort-value="0.92" | 920 m || 
|-id=197 bgcolor=#E9E9E9
| 457197 ||  || — || April 26, 2008 || Kitt Peak || Spacewatch || — || align=right | 2.7 km || 
|-id=198 bgcolor=#E9E9E9
| 457198 ||  || — || April 14, 2008 || Mount Lemmon || Mount Lemmon Survey || MIS || align=right | 1.7 km || 
|-id=199 bgcolor=#E9E9E9
| 457199 ||  || — || April 26, 2008 || Mount Lemmon || Mount Lemmon Survey || EUN || align=right | 1.1 km || 
|-id=200 bgcolor=#E9E9E9
| 457200 ||  || — || March 28, 2008 || Mount Lemmon || Mount Lemmon Survey || — || align=right | 1.9 km || 
|}

457201–457300 

|-bgcolor=#E9E9E9
| 457201 ||  || — || April 27, 2008 || Kitt Peak || Spacewatch || — || align=right data-sort-value="0.94" | 940 m || 
|-id=202 bgcolor=#E9E9E9
| 457202 ||  || — || April 29, 2008 || Kitt Peak || Spacewatch || — || align=right data-sort-value="0.95" | 950 m || 
|-id=203 bgcolor=#E9E9E9
| 457203 ||  || — || April 29, 2008 || Kitt Peak || Spacewatch || — || align=right | 1.3 km || 
|-id=204 bgcolor=#E9E9E9
| 457204 ||  || — || April 14, 2008 || Mount Lemmon || Mount Lemmon Survey || — || align=right data-sort-value="0.81" | 810 m || 
|-id=205 bgcolor=#E9E9E9
| 457205 ||  || — || May 3, 2008 || Dauban || F. Kugel || MAR || align=right data-sort-value="0.99" | 990 m || 
|-id=206 bgcolor=#E9E9E9
| 457206 ||  || — || May 1, 2008 || Catalina || CSS || (5) || align=right data-sort-value="0.89" | 890 m || 
|-id=207 bgcolor=#E9E9E9
| 457207 ||  || — || April 11, 2008 || Mount Lemmon || Mount Lemmon Survey || EUN || align=right | 1.2 km || 
|-id=208 bgcolor=#d6d6d6
| 457208 ||  || — || April 7, 2008 || Mount Lemmon || Mount Lemmon Survey || — || align=right | 3.7 km || 
|-id=209 bgcolor=#E9E9E9
| 457209 ||  || — || May 5, 2008 || Kitt Peak || Spacewatch || — || align=right | 2.0 km || 
|-id=210 bgcolor=#E9E9E9
| 457210 ||  || — || March 29, 2008 || Kitt Peak || Spacewatch || critical || align=right data-sort-value="0.90" | 900 m || 
|-id=211 bgcolor=#E9E9E9
| 457211 ||  || — || May 1, 2008 || Catalina || CSS || — || align=right | 3.2 km || 
|-id=212 bgcolor=#FFC2E0
| 457212 ||  || — || May 13, 2008 || Socorro || LINEAR || AMO || align=right data-sort-value="0.39" | 390 m || 
|-id=213 bgcolor=#E9E9E9
| 457213 ||  || — || May 11, 2008 || Socorro || LINEAR || — || align=right | 1.6 km || 
|-id=214 bgcolor=#E9E9E9
| 457214 ||  || — || May 11, 2008 || Kitt Peak || Spacewatch || — || align=right | 1.0 km || 
|-id=215 bgcolor=#E9E9E9
| 457215 ||  || — || April 6, 2008 || Mount Lemmon || Mount Lemmon Survey || JUN || align=right | 1.00 km || 
|-id=216 bgcolor=#E9E9E9
| 457216 ||  || — || May 3, 2008 || Kitt Peak || Spacewatch || — || align=right | 1.8 km || 
|-id=217 bgcolor=#E9E9E9
| 457217 ||  || — || May 3, 2008 || Mount Lemmon || Mount Lemmon Survey || — || align=right | 2.2 km || 
|-id=218 bgcolor=#E9E9E9
| 457218 ||  || — || May 27, 2008 || Kitt Peak || Spacewatch || — || align=right | 1.2 km || 
|-id=219 bgcolor=#d6d6d6
| 457219 ||  || — || May 4, 2008 || Kitt Peak || Spacewatch || — || align=right | 3.7 km || 
|-id=220 bgcolor=#E9E9E9
| 457220 ||  || — || May 26, 2008 || Kitt Peak || Spacewatch || — || align=right | 1.7 km || 
|-id=221 bgcolor=#C2FFFF
| 457221 ||  || — || April 1, 2008 || Kitt Peak || Spacewatch || L5 || align=right | 8.0 km || 
|-id=222 bgcolor=#E9E9E9
| 457222 ||  || — || May 27, 2008 || Kitt Peak || Spacewatch || — || align=right | 2.1 km || 
|-id=223 bgcolor=#E9E9E9
| 457223 ||  || — || May 28, 2008 || Kitt Peak || Spacewatch || — || align=right | 1.2 km || 
|-id=224 bgcolor=#E9E9E9
| 457224 ||  || — || April 16, 2008 || Mount Lemmon || Mount Lemmon Survey || — || align=right | 1.3 km || 
|-id=225 bgcolor=#E9E9E9
| 457225 ||  || — || May 2, 2008 || Kitt Peak || Spacewatch || JUN || align=right data-sort-value="0.99" | 990 m || 
|-id=226 bgcolor=#E9E9E9
| 457226 ||  || — || May 28, 2008 || Kitt Peak || Spacewatch || — || align=right | 1.7 km || 
|-id=227 bgcolor=#E9E9E9
| 457227 ||  || — || May 29, 2008 || Kitt Peak || Spacewatch || — || align=right | 1.3 km || 
|-id=228 bgcolor=#E9E9E9
| 457228 ||  || — || April 13, 2008 || Mount Lemmon || Mount Lemmon Survey || — || align=right data-sort-value="0.97" | 970 m || 
|-id=229 bgcolor=#E9E9E9
| 457229 ||  || — || May 13, 2008 || Mount Lemmon || Mount Lemmon Survey || — || align=right | 1.4 km || 
|-id=230 bgcolor=#E9E9E9
| 457230 ||  || — || March 29, 2008 || Kitt Peak || Spacewatch || NEM || align=right | 2.1 km || 
|-id=231 bgcolor=#E9E9E9
| 457231 ||  || — || May 3, 2008 || Mount Lemmon || Mount Lemmon Survey || — || align=right | 1.6 km || 
|-id=232 bgcolor=#E9E9E9
| 457232 ||  || — || May 30, 2008 || Mount Lemmon || Mount Lemmon Survey || — || align=right | 2.8 km || 
|-id=233 bgcolor=#E9E9E9
| 457233 ||  || — || May 27, 2008 || Mount Lemmon || Mount Lemmon Survey || — || align=right | 2.2 km || 
|-id=234 bgcolor=#E9E9E9
| 457234 ||  || — || April 30, 2008 || Mount Lemmon || Mount Lemmon Survey || — || align=right | 2.0 km || 
|-id=235 bgcolor=#E9E9E9
| 457235 ||  || — || June 7, 2008 || Kitt Peak || Spacewatch || — || align=right | 3.2 km || 
|-id=236 bgcolor=#E9E9E9
| 457236 ||  || — || May 2, 2008 || Kitt Peak || Spacewatch || — || align=right data-sort-value="0.90" | 900 m || 
|-id=237 bgcolor=#E9E9E9
| 457237 ||  || — || June 8, 2008 || Kitt Peak || Spacewatch || — || align=right | 1.4 km || 
|-id=238 bgcolor=#E9E9E9
| 457238 ||  || — || April 27, 2008 || Mount Lemmon || Mount Lemmon Survey || — || align=right | 1.4 km || 
|-id=239 bgcolor=#E9E9E9
| 457239 ||  || — || July 6, 2008 || Antares || ARO || — || align=right | 2.0 km || 
|-id=240 bgcolor=#d6d6d6
| 457240 ||  || — || July 26, 2008 || Siding Spring || SSS || — || align=right | 3.0 km || 
|-id=241 bgcolor=#E9E9E9
| 457241 ||  || — || July 29, 2008 || Mount Lemmon || Mount Lemmon Survey || — || align=right | 3.0 km || 
|-id=242 bgcolor=#d6d6d6
| 457242 ||  || — || September 28, 2003 || Socorro || LINEAR || — || align=right | 3.4 km || 
|-id=243 bgcolor=#d6d6d6
| 457243 ||  || — || July 29, 2008 || Kitt Peak || Spacewatch || — || align=right | 3.3 km || 
|-id=244 bgcolor=#d6d6d6
| 457244 ||  || — || July 30, 2008 || Kitt Peak || Spacewatch || — || align=right | 2.4 km || 
|-id=245 bgcolor=#d6d6d6
| 457245 ||  || — || July 30, 2008 || Kitt Peak || Spacewatch || HYG || align=right | 2.4 km || 
|-id=246 bgcolor=#E9E9E9
| 457246 ||  || — || August 1, 2008 || La Sagra || OAM Obs. || — || align=right | 2.1 km || 
|-id=247 bgcolor=#d6d6d6
| 457247 ||  || — || July 31, 2008 || Mount Lemmon || Mount Lemmon Survey || — || align=right | 3.7 km || 
|-id=248 bgcolor=#d6d6d6
| 457248 || 2008 QH || — || August 20, 2008 || Vallemare di Borbona || V. S. Casulli || — || align=right | 3.2 km || 
|-id=249 bgcolor=#d6d6d6
| 457249 ||  || — || June 8, 2008 || Kitt Peak || Spacewatch || — || align=right | 3.9 km || 
|-id=250 bgcolor=#d6d6d6
| 457250 ||  || — || July 31, 2008 || Kitt Peak || Spacewatch || — || align=right | 3.3 km || 
|-id=251 bgcolor=#E9E9E9
| 457251 ||  || — || August 26, 2008 || Dauban || F. Kugel || — || align=right | 2.9 km || 
|-id=252 bgcolor=#fefefe
| 457252 ||  || — || August 31, 2008 || La Sagra || OAM Obs. || — || align=right data-sort-value="0.64" | 640 m || 
|-id=253 bgcolor=#d6d6d6
| 457253 ||  || — || August 30, 2008 || Socorro || LINEAR || — || align=right | 3.4 km || 
|-id=254 bgcolor=#d6d6d6
| 457254 ||  || — || August 25, 2008 || Siding Spring || SSS || Tj (2.97) || align=right | 5.2 km || 
|-id=255 bgcolor=#d6d6d6
| 457255 ||  || — || August 24, 2008 || Kitt Peak || Spacewatch || — || align=right | 3.9 km || 
|-id=256 bgcolor=#d6d6d6
| 457256 ||  || — || September 2, 2008 || Kitt Peak || Spacewatch || EMA || align=right | 3.3 km || 
|-id=257 bgcolor=#fefefe
| 457257 ||  || — || September 3, 2008 || Kitt Peak || Spacewatch || — || align=right data-sort-value="0.56" | 560 m || 
|-id=258 bgcolor=#d6d6d6
| 457258 ||  || — || August 20, 2008 || Kitt Peak || Spacewatch || — || align=right | 3.2 km || 
|-id=259 bgcolor=#d6d6d6
| 457259 ||  || — || September 4, 2008 || Kitt Peak || Spacewatch || HYG || align=right | 2.2 km || 
|-id=260 bgcolor=#FFC2E0
| 457260 ||  || — || September 7, 2008 || Catalina || CSS || AMO +1km || align=right data-sort-value="0.95" | 950 m || 
|-id=261 bgcolor=#FA8072
| 457261 ||  || — || September 7, 2008 || Mount Lemmon || Mount Lemmon Survey || — || align=right | 1.8 km || 
|-id=262 bgcolor=#d6d6d6
| 457262 ||  || — || September 2, 2008 || Kitt Peak || Spacewatch || — || align=right | 2.5 km || 
|-id=263 bgcolor=#d6d6d6
| 457263 ||  || — || September 2, 2008 || Kitt Peak || Spacewatch || TRE || align=right | 2.2 km || 
|-id=264 bgcolor=#d6d6d6
| 457264 ||  || — || September 2, 2008 || Kitt Peak || Spacewatch || 7:4 || align=right | 3.6 km || 
|-id=265 bgcolor=#d6d6d6
| 457265 ||  || — || September 2, 2008 || Kitt Peak || Spacewatch || EOS || align=right | 1.7 km || 
|-id=266 bgcolor=#fefefe
| 457266 ||  || — || September 2, 2008 || Kitt Peak || Spacewatch || — || align=right data-sort-value="0.47" | 470 m || 
|-id=267 bgcolor=#d6d6d6
| 457267 ||  || — || September 2, 2008 || Kitt Peak || Spacewatch || — || align=right | 3.0 km || 
|-id=268 bgcolor=#d6d6d6
| 457268 ||  || — || September 2, 2008 || Kitt Peak || Spacewatch || VER || align=right | 2.3 km || 
|-id=269 bgcolor=#fefefe
| 457269 ||  || — || September 2, 2008 || Kitt Peak || Spacewatch || — || align=right data-sort-value="0.54" | 540 m || 
|-id=270 bgcolor=#fefefe
| 457270 ||  || — || September 2, 2008 || Kitt Peak || Spacewatch || — || align=right data-sort-value="0.71" | 710 m || 
|-id=271 bgcolor=#d6d6d6
| 457271 ||  || — || July 29, 2008 || Mount Lemmon || Mount Lemmon Survey || EOS || align=right | 1.7 km || 
|-id=272 bgcolor=#d6d6d6
| 457272 ||  || — || July 29, 2008 || Mount Lemmon || Mount Lemmon Survey || EOS || align=right | 1.8 km || 
|-id=273 bgcolor=#fefefe
| 457273 ||  || — || September 4, 2008 || Kitt Peak || Spacewatch || — || align=right data-sort-value="0.60" | 600 m || 
|-id=274 bgcolor=#d6d6d6
| 457274 ||  || — || September 6, 2008 || Mount Lemmon || Mount Lemmon Survey || — || align=right | 3.7 km || 
|-id=275 bgcolor=#fefefe
| 457275 ||  || — || September 10, 2008 || Wrightwood || J. W. Young || — || align=right data-sort-value="0.64" | 640 m || 
|-id=276 bgcolor=#d6d6d6
| 457276 ||  || — || August 24, 2008 || Kitt Peak || Spacewatch || — || align=right | 2.5 km || 
|-id=277 bgcolor=#d6d6d6
| 457277 ||  || — || July 29, 2008 || Kitt Peak || Spacewatch || — || align=right | 2.7 km || 
|-id=278 bgcolor=#d6d6d6
| 457278 ||  || — || September 5, 2008 || Kitt Peak || Spacewatch || — || align=right | 3.1 km || 
|-id=279 bgcolor=#d6d6d6
| 457279 ||  || — || September 5, 2008 || Kitt Peak || Spacewatch || — || align=right | 2.4 km || 
|-id=280 bgcolor=#d6d6d6
| 457280 ||  || — || September 5, 2008 || Kitt Peak || Spacewatch || EOS || align=right | 1.8 km || 
|-id=281 bgcolor=#d6d6d6
| 457281 ||  || — || September 5, 2008 || Kitt Peak || Spacewatch || EOS || align=right | 1.5 km || 
|-id=282 bgcolor=#d6d6d6
| 457282 ||  || — || September 2, 2008 || Kitt Peak || Spacewatch || — || align=right | 3.1 km || 
|-id=283 bgcolor=#d6d6d6
| 457283 ||  || — || September 5, 2008 || Kitt Peak || Spacewatch || URS || align=right | 3.0 km || 
|-id=284 bgcolor=#d6d6d6
| 457284 ||  || — || September 6, 2008 || Mount Lemmon || Mount Lemmon Survey || — || align=right | 3.3 km || 
|-id=285 bgcolor=#d6d6d6
| 457285 ||  || — || September 4, 2008 || Kitt Peak || Spacewatch || EOS || align=right | 2.2 km || 
|-id=286 bgcolor=#d6d6d6
| 457286 ||  || — || September 5, 2008 || Kitt Peak || Spacewatch || — || align=right | 2.9 km || 
|-id=287 bgcolor=#d6d6d6
| 457287 ||  || — || September 6, 2008 || Kitt Peak || Spacewatch || HYG || align=right | 2.4 km || 
|-id=288 bgcolor=#d6d6d6
| 457288 ||  || — || September 9, 2008 || Mount Lemmon || Mount Lemmon Survey || — || align=right | 2.6 km || 
|-id=289 bgcolor=#d6d6d6
| 457289 ||  || — || September 9, 2008 || Mount Lemmon || Mount Lemmon Survey || EOS || align=right | 2.2 km || 
|-id=290 bgcolor=#fefefe
| 457290 ||  || — || September 7, 2008 || Mount Lemmon || Mount Lemmon Survey || — || align=right data-sort-value="0.54" | 540 m || 
|-id=291 bgcolor=#d6d6d6
| 457291 ||  || — || September 5, 2008 || Socorro || LINEAR || — || align=right | 2.9 km || 
|-id=292 bgcolor=#d6d6d6
| 457292 ||  || — || September 6, 2008 || Catalina || CSS || — || align=right | 4.3 km || 
|-id=293 bgcolor=#fefefe
| 457293 ||  || — || September 3, 2008 || Kitt Peak || Spacewatch || — || align=right data-sort-value="0.79" | 790 m || 
|-id=294 bgcolor=#d6d6d6
| 457294 ||  || — || September 5, 2008 || Kitt Peak || Spacewatch || — || align=right | 3.0 km || 
|-id=295 bgcolor=#d6d6d6
| 457295 ||  || — || September 6, 2008 || Catalina || CSS || — || align=right | 3.2 km || 
|-id=296 bgcolor=#d6d6d6
| 457296 ||  || — || September 9, 2008 || Catalina || CSS || EOS || align=right | 2.3 km || 
|-id=297 bgcolor=#d6d6d6
| 457297 ||  || — || September 9, 2008 || Kitt Peak || Spacewatch || — || align=right | 2.4 km || 
|-id=298 bgcolor=#d6d6d6
| 457298 ||  || — || September 7, 2008 || Socorro || LINEAR || — || align=right | 3.7 km || 
|-id=299 bgcolor=#d6d6d6
| 457299 ||  || — || September 7, 2008 || Socorro || LINEAR || — || align=right | 3.6 km || 
|-id=300 bgcolor=#d6d6d6
| 457300 ||  || — || September 2, 2008 || Kitt Peak || Spacewatch || — || align=right | 2.8 km || 
|}

457301–457400 

|-bgcolor=#d6d6d6
| 457301 ||  || — || September 3, 2008 || Kitt Peak || Spacewatch || — || align=right | 2.4 km || 
|-id=302 bgcolor=#fefefe
| 457302 ||  || — || September 4, 2008 || Kitt Peak || Spacewatch || — || align=right data-sort-value="0.61" | 610 m || 
|-id=303 bgcolor=#fefefe
| 457303 ||  || — || September 23, 2008 || Moletai || Molėtai Obs. || — || align=right data-sort-value="0.62" | 620 m || 
|-id=304 bgcolor=#d6d6d6
| 457304 ||  || — || September 6, 2008 || Mount Lemmon || Mount Lemmon Survey || — || align=right | 3.1 km || 
|-id=305 bgcolor=#d6d6d6
| 457305 ||  || — || September 20, 2008 || Kitt Peak || Spacewatch || — || align=right | 3.7 km || 
|-id=306 bgcolor=#d6d6d6
| 457306 ||  || — || September 6, 2008 || Mount Lemmon || Mount Lemmon Survey || — || align=right | 2.4 km || 
|-id=307 bgcolor=#d6d6d6
| 457307 ||  || — || September 20, 2008 || Kitt Peak || Spacewatch || — || align=right | 3.5 km || 
|-id=308 bgcolor=#d6d6d6
| 457308 ||  || — || September 20, 2008 || Kitt Peak || Spacewatch || — || align=right | 2.5 km || 
|-id=309 bgcolor=#d6d6d6
| 457309 ||  || — || September 7, 2008 || Mount Lemmon || Mount Lemmon Survey || — || align=right | 2.9 km || 
|-id=310 bgcolor=#d6d6d6
| 457310 ||  || — || September 10, 2008 || Kitt Peak || Spacewatch || EOS || align=right | 1.4 km || 
|-id=311 bgcolor=#d6d6d6
| 457311 ||  || — || September 20, 2008 || Mount Lemmon || Mount Lemmon Survey || — || align=right | 3.1 km || 
|-id=312 bgcolor=#d6d6d6
| 457312 ||  || — || September 3, 2008 || Kitt Peak || Spacewatch || — || align=right | 3.2 km || 
|-id=313 bgcolor=#fefefe
| 457313 ||  || — || September 21, 2008 || Mount Lemmon || Mount Lemmon Survey || — || align=right data-sort-value="0.71" | 710 m || 
|-id=314 bgcolor=#d6d6d6
| 457314 ||  || — || September 21, 2008 || Mount Lemmon || Mount Lemmon Survey || — || align=right | 3.2 km || 
|-id=315 bgcolor=#d6d6d6
| 457315 ||  || — || September 3, 2008 || Kitt Peak || Spacewatch || — || align=right | 2.7 km || 
|-id=316 bgcolor=#d6d6d6
| 457316 ||  || — || September 22, 2008 || Calvin-Rehoboth || L. A. Molnar || — || align=right | 2.6 km || 
|-id=317 bgcolor=#d6d6d6
| 457317 ||  || — || September 21, 2008 || Mount Lemmon || Mount Lemmon Survey || — || align=right | 3.2 km || 
|-id=318 bgcolor=#d6d6d6
| 457318 ||  || — || September 21, 2008 || Kitt Peak || Spacewatch || — || align=right | 2.7 km || 
|-id=319 bgcolor=#d6d6d6
| 457319 ||  || — || September 21, 2008 || Kitt Peak || Spacewatch || — || align=right | 2.4 km || 
|-id=320 bgcolor=#fefefe
| 457320 ||  || — || September 21, 2008 || Kitt Peak || Spacewatch || — || align=right data-sort-value="0.73" | 730 m || 
|-id=321 bgcolor=#fefefe
| 457321 ||  || — || September 21, 2008 || Kitt Peak || Spacewatch || — || align=right data-sort-value="0.74" | 740 m || 
|-id=322 bgcolor=#fefefe
| 457322 ||  || — || September 22, 2008 || Kitt Peak || Spacewatch || (2076) || align=right data-sort-value="0.76" | 760 m || 
|-id=323 bgcolor=#d6d6d6
| 457323 ||  || — || September 22, 2008 || Kitt Peak || Spacewatch || HYG || align=right | 2.7 km || 
|-id=324 bgcolor=#fefefe
| 457324 ||  || — || September 23, 2008 || Mount Lemmon || Mount Lemmon Survey || — || align=right data-sort-value="0.65" | 650 m || 
|-id=325 bgcolor=#fefefe
| 457325 ||  || — || September 24, 2008 || Mount Lemmon || Mount Lemmon Survey || — || align=right data-sort-value="0.76" | 760 m || 
|-id=326 bgcolor=#d6d6d6
| 457326 ||  || — || September 5, 2008 || Kitt Peak || Spacewatch || EOS || align=right | 1.7 km || 
|-id=327 bgcolor=#fefefe
| 457327 ||  || — || August 23, 2008 || Kitt Peak || Spacewatch || — || align=right data-sort-value="0.63" | 630 m || 
|-id=328 bgcolor=#d6d6d6
| 457328 ||  || — || September 28, 2008 || Socorro || LINEAR || — || align=right | 3.6 km || 
|-id=329 bgcolor=#d6d6d6
| 457329 ||  || — || September 3, 2008 || Kitt Peak || Spacewatch || EOS || align=right | 1.9 km || 
|-id=330 bgcolor=#d6d6d6
| 457330 ||  || — || September 6, 2008 || Kitt Peak || Spacewatch || — || align=right | 2.8 km || 
|-id=331 bgcolor=#d6d6d6
| 457331 ||  || — || September 3, 2008 || Kitt Peak || Spacewatch || — || align=right | 3.2 km || 
|-id=332 bgcolor=#d6d6d6
| 457332 ||  || — || September 22, 2008 || Kitt Peak || Spacewatch || — || align=right | 4.8 km || 
|-id=333 bgcolor=#d6d6d6
| 457333 ||  || — || September 24, 2008 || Kitt Peak || Spacewatch || — || align=right | 2.3 km || 
|-id=334 bgcolor=#fefefe
| 457334 ||  || — || September 24, 2008 || Kitt Peak || Spacewatch || — || align=right data-sort-value="0.49" | 490 m || 
|-id=335 bgcolor=#d6d6d6
| 457335 ||  || — || September 25, 2008 || Kitt Peak || Spacewatch || — || align=right | 2.8 km || 
|-id=336 bgcolor=#fefefe
| 457336 ||  || — || September 6, 2008 || Mount Lemmon || Mount Lemmon Survey || — || align=right data-sort-value="0.76" | 760 m || 
|-id=337 bgcolor=#fefefe
| 457337 ||  || — || September 25, 2008 || Kitt Peak || Spacewatch || — || align=right data-sort-value="0.59" | 590 m || 
|-id=338 bgcolor=#fefefe
| 457338 ||  || — || April 24, 2003 || Kitt Peak || Spacewatch || — || align=right data-sort-value="0.98" | 980 m || 
|-id=339 bgcolor=#d6d6d6
| 457339 ||  || — || September 26, 2008 || Kitt Peak || Spacewatch || 7:4 || align=right | 2.6 km || 
|-id=340 bgcolor=#d6d6d6
| 457340 ||  || — || September 27, 2008 || Catalina || CSS || — || align=right | 4.0 km || 
|-id=341 bgcolor=#d6d6d6
| 457341 ||  || — || September 6, 2008 || Kitt Peak || Spacewatch || — || align=right | 2.3 km || 
|-id=342 bgcolor=#d6d6d6
| 457342 ||  || — || September 6, 2008 || Kitt Peak || Spacewatch || VER || align=right | 2.0 km || 
|-id=343 bgcolor=#d6d6d6
| 457343 ||  || — || September 5, 2008 || Kitt Peak || Spacewatch || — || align=right | 3.4 km || 
|-id=344 bgcolor=#d6d6d6
| 457344 ||  || — || September 4, 2008 || Kitt Peak || Spacewatch || — || align=right | 2.8 km || 
|-id=345 bgcolor=#d6d6d6
| 457345 ||  || — || September 25, 2008 || Mount Lemmon || Mount Lemmon Survey || — || align=right | 2.2 km || 
|-id=346 bgcolor=#d6d6d6
| 457346 ||  || — || September 25, 2008 || Mount Lemmon || Mount Lemmon Survey || — || align=right | 2.4 km || 
|-id=347 bgcolor=#fefefe
| 457347 ||  || — || September 25, 2008 || Mount Lemmon || Mount Lemmon Survey || — || align=right data-sort-value="0.62" | 620 m || 
|-id=348 bgcolor=#d6d6d6
| 457348 ||  || — || September 26, 2008 || Kitt Peak || Spacewatch || — || align=right | 3.0 km || 
|-id=349 bgcolor=#d6d6d6
| 457349 ||  || — || September 28, 2008 || Mount Lemmon || Mount Lemmon Survey || — || align=right | 2.3 km || 
|-id=350 bgcolor=#d6d6d6
| 457350 ||  || — || September 20, 2008 || Mount Lemmon || Mount Lemmon Survey || — || align=right | 2.1 km || 
|-id=351 bgcolor=#d6d6d6
| 457351 ||  || — || September 23, 2008 || Mount Lemmon || Mount Lemmon Survey || EOS || align=right | 1.5 km || 
|-id=352 bgcolor=#d6d6d6
| 457352 ||  || — || September 22, 2008 || Mount Lemmon || Mount Lemmon Survey || — || align=right | 2.7 km || 
|-id=353 bgcolor=#d6d6d6
| 457353 ||  || — || September 22, 2008 || Mount Lemmon || Mount Lemmon Survey || — || align=right | 2.4 km || 
|-id=354 bgcolor=#fefefe
| 457354 ||  || — || September 23, 2008 || Mount Lemmon || Mount Lemmon Survey || — || align=right data-sort-value="0.61" | 610 m || 
|-id=355 bgcolor=#d6d6d6
| 457355 ||  || — || September 24, 2008 || Kitt Peak || Spacewatch || THM || align=right | 2.3 km || 
|-id=356 bgcolor=#d6d6d6
| 457356 ||  || — || September 24, 2008 || Kitt Peak || Spacewatch || — || align=right | 2.3 km || 
|-id=357 bgcolor=#d6d6d6
| 457357 ||  || — || September 26, 2008 || Kitt Peak || Spacewatch || — || align=right | 3.4 km || 
|-id=358 bgcolor=#d6d6d6
| 457358 ||  || — || September 22, 2008 || Catalina || CSS || — || align=right | 4.2 km || 
|-id=359 bgcolor=#fefefe
| 457359 ||  || — || September 23, 2008 || Kitt Peak || Spacewatch || — || align=right data-sort-value="0.70" | 700 m || 
|-id=360 bgcolor=#d6d6d6
| 457360 ||  || — || September 22, 2008 || Mount Lemmon || Mount Lemmon Survey || — || align=right | 3.1 km || 
|-id=361 bgcolor=#E9E9E9
| 457361 ||  || — || September 23, 2008 || Kitt Peak || Spacewatch || — || align=right | 2.7 km || 
|-id=362 bgcolor=#d6d6d6
| 457362 ||  || — || September 29, 2008 || Kitt Peak || Spacewatch || — || align=right | 3.0 km || 
|-id=363 bgcolor=#fefefe
| 457363 ||  || — || September 24, 2008 || Kitt Peak || Spacewatch || — || align=right data-sort-value="0.70" | 700 m || 
|-id=364 bgcolor=#d6d6d6
| 457364 ||  || — || September 25, 2008 || Kitt Peak || Spacewatch || — || align=right | 4.0 km || 
|-id=365 bgcolor=#fefefe
| 457365 ||  || — || September 27, 2008 || Mount Lemmon || Mount Lemmon Survey || — || align=right data-sort-value="0.69" | 690 m || 
|-id=366 bgcolor=#d6d6d6
| 457366 ||  || — || September 23, 2008 || Kitt Peak || Spacewatch || — || align=right | 2.5 km || 
|-id=367 bgcolor=#fefefe
| 457367 ||  || — || September 24, 2008 || Catalina || CSS || — || align=right data-sort-value="0.65" | 650 m || 
|-id=368 bgcolor=#d6d6d6
| 457368 ||  || — || September 23, 2008 || Catalina || CSS || — || align=right | 3.3 km || 
|-id=369 bgcolor=#E9E9E9
| 457369 ||  || — || September 24, 2008 || Catalina || CSS || JUN || align=right | 1.3 km || 
|-id=370 bgcolor=#fefefe
| 457370 ||  || — || September 29, 2008 || Socorro || LINEAR || — || align=right data-sort-value="0.67" | 670 m || 
|-id=371 bgcolor=#fefefe
| 457371 ||  || — || September 29, 2008 || Catalina || CSS || — || align=right data-sort-value="0.66" | 660 m || 
|-id=372 bgcolor=#fefefe
| 457372 ||  || — || October 1, 2008 || Catalina || CSS || — || align=right data-sort-value="0.69" | 690 m || 
|-id=373 bgcolor=#fefefe
| 457373 ||  || — || October 1, 2008 || Mount Lemmon || Mount Lemmon Survey || — || align=right data-sort-value="0.52" | 520 m || 
|-id=374 bgcolor=#fefefe
| 457374 ||  || — || October 2, 2008 || Kitt Peak || Spacewatch || — || align=right data-sort-value="0.49" | 490 m || 
|-id=375 bgcolor=#d6d6d6
| 457375 ||  || — || September 8, 2008 || Mount Lemmon || Mount Lemmon Survey || HYG || align=right | 2.7 km || 
|-id=376 bgcolor=#fefefe
| 457376 ||  || — || September 19, 2008 || Kitt Peak || Spacewatch || — || align=right data-sort-value="0.64" | 640 m || 
|-id=377 bgcolor=#d6d6d6
| 457377 ||  || — || October 1, 2008 || Mount Lemmon || Mount Lemmon Survey || HYG || align=right | 2.8 km || 
|-id=378 bgcolor=#d6d6d6
| 457378 ||  || — || October 1, 2008 || Kitt Peak || Spacewatch || — || align=right | 2.4 km || 
|-id=379 bgcolor=#d6d6d6
| 457379 ||  || — || October 1, 2008 || Kitt Peak || Spacewatch || URS || align=right | 3.0 km || 
|-id=380 bgcolor=#fefefe
| 457380 ||  || — || October 1, 2008 || Kitt Peak || Spacewatch || — || align=right data-sort-value="0.56" | 560 m || 
|-id=381 bgcolor=#d6d6d6
| 457381 ||  || — || October 1, 2008 || Mount Lemmon || Mount Lemmon Survey || — || align=right | 2.8 km || 
|-id=382 bgcolor=#d6d6d6
| 457382 ||  || — || October 1, 2008 || Mount Lemmon || Mount Lemmon Survey || — || align=right | 2.9 km || 
|-id=383 bgcolor=#d6d6d6
| 457383 ||  || — || September 22, 2008 || Mount Lemmon || Mount Lemmon Survey || 7:4 || align=right | 2.3 km || 
|-id=384 bgcolor=#fefefe
| 457384 ||  || — || October 1, 2008 || Mount Lemmon || Mount Lemmon Survey || — || align=right data-sort-value="0.53" | 530 m || 
|-id=385 bgcolor=#d6d6d6
| 457385 ||  || — || September 24, 2008 || Kitt Peak || Spacewatch || — || align=right | 2.5 km || 
|-id=386 bgcolor=#d6d6d6
| 457386 ||  || — || October 2, 2008 || Kitt Peak || Spacewatch || — || align=right | 2.2 km || 
|-id=387 bgcolor=#d6d6d6
| 457387 ||  || — || September 24, 2008 || Kitt Peak || Spacewatch || — || align=right | 2.7 km || 
|-id=388 bgcolor=#d6d6d6
| 457388 ||  || — || September 24, 2008 || Kitt Peak || Spacewatch || — || align=right | 2.3 km || 
|-id=389 bgcolor=#d6d6d6
| 457389 ||  || — || October 2, 2008 || Kitt Peak || Spacewatch || — || align=right | 2.6 km || 
|-id=390 bgcolor=#d6d6d6
| 457390 ||  || — || October 2, 2008 || Kitt Peak || Spacewatch || — || align=right | 2.2 km || 
|-id=391 bgcolor=#d6d6d6
| 457391 ||  || — || October 2, 2008 || Kitt Peak || Spacewatch || — || align=right | 2.6 km || 
|-id=392 bgcolor=#fefefe
| 457392 ||  || — || October 2, 2008 || Kitt Peak || Spacewatch || — || align=right data-sort-value="0.50" | 500 m || 
|-id=393 bgcolor=#d6d6d6
| 457393 ||  || — || October 2, 2008 || Kitt Peak || Spacewatch || VER || align=right | 2.4 km || 
|-id=394 bgcolor=#fefefe
| 457394 ||  || — || October 2, 2008 || Kitt Peak || Spacewatch || — || align=right data-sort-value="0.63" | 630 m || 
|-id=395 bgcolor=#d6d6d6
| 457395 ||  || — || October 2, 2008 || Kitt Peak || Spacewatch || — || align=right | 3.6 km || 
|-id=396 bgcolor=#d6d6d6
| 457396 ||  || — || September 22, 2008 || Mount Lemmon || Mount Lemmon Survey || — || align=right | 2.7 km || 
|-id=397 bgcolor=#fefefe
| 457397 ||  || — || October 2, 2008 || Mount Lemmon || Mount Lemmon Survey || — || align=right data-sort-value="0.54" | 540 m || 
|-id=398 bgcolor=#fefefe
| 457398 ||  || — || October 3, 2008 || Kitt Peak || Spacewatch || — || align=right data-sort-value="0.57" | 570 m || 
|-id=399 bgcolor=#fefefe
| 457399 ||  || — || September 4, 2008 || Kitt Peak || Spacewatch || — || align=right data-sort-value="0.71" | 710 m || 
|-id=400 bgcolor=#d6d6d6
| 457400 ||  || — || September 6, 2008 || Mount Lemmon || Mount Lemmon Survey || — || align=right | 2.7 km || 
|}

457401–457500 

|-bgcolor=#d6d6d6
| 457401 ||  || — || October 6, 2008 || Kitt Peak || Spacewatch || — || align=right | 2.6 km || 
|-id=402 bgcolor=#d6d6d6
| 457402 ||  || — || October 6, 2008 || Mount Lemmon || Mount Lemmon Survey || — || align=right | 3.1 km || 
|-id=403 bgcolor=#fefefe
| 457403 ||  || — || September 23, 2008 || Catalina || CSS || — || align=right data-sort-value="0.79" | 790 m || 
|-id=404 bgcolor=#fefefe
| 457404 ||  || — || September 23, 2008 || Kitt Peak || Spacewatch || — || align=right data-sort-value="0.74" | 740 m || 
|-id=405 bgcolor=#d6d6d6
| 457405 ||  || — || October 7, 2008 || Kitt Peak || Spacewatch || VER || align=right | 3.1 km || 
|-id=406 bgcolor=#d6d6d6
| 457406 ||  || — || October 8, 2008 || Mount Lemmon || Mount Lemmon Survey || — || align=right | 4.3 km || 
|-id=407 bgcolor=#d6d6d6
| 457407 ||  || — || September 23, 2008 || Kitt Peak || Spacewatch || — || align=right | 2.7 km || 
|-id=408 bgcolor=#fefefe
| 457408 ||  || — || October 8, 2008 || Mount Lemmon || Mount Lemmon Survey || — || align=right data-sort-value="0.66" | 660 m || 
|-id=409 bgcolor=#fefefe
| 457409 ||  || — || September 7, 2008 || Mount Lemmon || Mount Lemmon Survey || — || align=right data-sort-value="0.64" | 640 m || 
|-id=410 bgcolor=#d6d6d6
| 457410 ||  || — || September 23, 2008 || Mount Lemmon || Mount Lemmon Survey || — || align=right | 2.6 km || 
|-id=411 bgcolor=#d6d6d6
| 457411 ||  || — || October 9, 2008 || Mount Lemmon || Mount Lemmon Survey || — || align=right | 2.8 km || 
|-id=412 bgcolor=#d6d6d6
| 457412 ||  || — || October 9, 2008 || Mount Lemmon || Mount Lemmon Survey || — || align=right | 2.6 km || 
|-id=413 bgcolor=#d6d6d6
| 457413 ||  || — || October 1, 2008 || Kitt Peak || Spacewatch || — || align=right | 2.9 km || 
|-id=414 bgcolor=#d6d6d6
| 457414 ||  || — || October 1, 2008 || Catalina || CSS || THB || align=right | 2.8 km || 
|-id=415 bgcolor=#d6d6d6
| 457415 ||  || — || October 1, 2008 || Kitt Peak || Spacewatch || HYG || align=right | 2.2 km || 
|-id=416 bgcolor=#fefefe
| 457416 ||  || — || October 9, 2008 || Kitt Peak || Spacewatch || — || align=right data-sort-value="0.67" | 670 m || 
|-id=417 bgcolor=#d6d6d6
| 457417 ||  || — || September 29, 2008 || Socorro || LINEAR || — || align=right | 3.5 km || 
|-id=418 bgcolor=#d6d6d6
| 457418 ||  || — || October 6, 2008 || Catalina || CSS || — || align=right | 4.1 km || 
|-id=419 bgcolor=#d6d6d6
| 457419 ||  || — || October 6, 2008 || Kitt Peak || Spacewatch || EOS || align=right | 1.8 km || 
|-id=420 bgcolor=#d6d6d6
| 457420 ||  || — || October 6, 2008 || Mount Lemmon || Mount Lemmon Survey || — || align=right | 3.4 km || 
|-id=421 bgcolor=#d6d6d6
| 457421 ||  || — || September 5, 2008 || Kitt Peak || Spacewatch || — || align=right | 3.0 km || 
|-id=422 bgcolor=#d6d6d6
| 457422 ||  || — || September 23, 2008 || Kitt Peak || Spacewatch || — || align=right | 2.9 km || 
|-id=423 bgcolor=#d6d6d6
| 457423 ||  || — || October 2, 2008 || Kitt Peak || Spacewatch || — || align=right | 2.8 km || 
|-id=424 bgcolor=#fefefe
| 457424 ||  || — || September 20, 2008 || Kitt Peak || Spacewatch || — || align=right data-sort-value="0.63" | 630 m || 
|-id=425 bgcolor=#fefefe
| 457425 ||  || — || October 20, 2008 || Kitt Peak || Spacewatch || — || align=right data-sort-value="0.70" | 700 m || 
|-id=426 bgcolor=#d6d6d6
| 457426 ||  || — || October 6, 2008 || Mount Lemmon || Mount Lemmon Survey || EOS || align=right | 2.0 km || 
|-id=427 bgcolor=#d6d6d6
| 457427 ||  || — || October 20, 2008 || Kitt Peak || Spacewatch || — || align=right | 2.7 km || 
|-id=428 bgcolor=#d6d6d6
| 457428 ||  || — || October 20, 2008 || Kitt Peak || Spacewatch || VER || align=right | 2.9 km || 
|-id=429 bgcolor=#fefefe
| 457429 ||  || — || September 25, 2008 || Mount Lemmon || Mount Lemmon Survey || — || align=right data-sort-value="0.56" | 560 m || 
|-id=430 bgcolor=#fefefe
| 457430 ||  || — || September 24, 2008 || Mount Lemmon || Mount Lemmon Survey || — || align=right data-sort-value="0.57" | 570 m || 
|-id=431 bgcolor=#fefefe
| 457431 ||  || — || October 20, 2008 || Kitt Peak || Spacewatch || — || align=right data-sort-value="0.64" | 640 m || 
|-id=432 bgcolor=#d6d6d6
| 457432 ||  || — || October 21, 2008 || Mount Lemmon || Mount Lemmon Survey || — || align=right | 2.6 km || 
|-id=433 bgcolor=#d6d6d6
| 457433 ||  || — || October 21, 2008 || Kitt Peak || Spacewatch || EOS || align=right | 2.1 km || 
|-id=434 bgcolor=#d6d6d6
| 457434 ||  || — || October 21, 2008 || Lulin Observatory || LUSS || EOS || align=right | 2.3 km || 
|-id=435 bgcolor=#d6d6d6
| 457435 ||  || — || October 8, 2008 || Mount Lemmon || Mount Lemmon Survey || — || align=right | 3.0 km || 
|-id=436 bgcolor=#d6d6d6
| 457436 ||  || — || October 22, 2008 || Kitt Peak || Spacewatch || — || align=right | 2.7 km || 
|-id=437 bgcolor=#fefefe
| 457437 ||  || — || October 20, 2008 || Kitt Peak || Spacewatch || — || align=right data-sort-value="0.46" | 460 m || 
|-id=438 bgcolor=#fefefe
| 457438 ||  || — || October 20, 2008 || Kitt Peak || Spacewatch || — || align=right data-sort-value="0.59" | 590 m || 
|-id=439 bgcolor=#fefefe
| 457439 ||  || — || October 22, 2008 || Kitt Peak || Spacewatch || — || align=right data-sort-value="0.73" | 730 m || 
|-id=440 bgcolor=#d6d6d6
| 457440 ||  || — || September 29, 2008 || Mount Lemmon || Mount Lemmon Survey || — || align=right | 3.1 km || 
|-id=441 bgcolor=#fefefe
| 457441 ||  || — || October 22, 2008 || Kitt Peak || Spacewatch || — || align=right data-sort-value="0.55" | 550 m || 
|-id=442 bgcolor=#d6d6d6
| 457442 ||  || — || October 22, 2008 || Kitt Peak || Spacewatch || VER || align=right | 3.4 km || 
|-id=443 bgcolor=#d6d6d6
| 457443 ||  || — || October 22, 2008 || Kitt Peak || Spacewatch || — || align=right | 3.4 km || 
|-id=444 bgcolor=#fefefe
| 457444 ||  || — || October 22, 2008 || Kitt Peak || Spacewatch || — || align=right data-sort-value="0.62" | 620 m || 
|-id=445 bgcolor=#fefefe
| 457445 ||  || — || October 22, 2008 || Mount Lemmon || Mount Lemmon Survey || — || align=right data-sort-value="0.78" | 780 m || 
|-id=446 bgcolor=#fefefe
| 457446 ||  || — || October 23, 2008 || Kitt Peak || Spacewatch || — || align=right data-sort-value="0.50" | 500 m || 
|-id=447 bgcolor=#d6d6d6
| 457447 ||  || — || October 23, 2008 || Kitt Peak || Spacewatch || — || align=right | 2.4 km || 
|-id=448 bgcolor=#fefefe
| 457448 ||  || — || October 9, 2008 || Kitt Peak || Spacewatch || — || align=right data-sort-value="0.47" | 470 m || 
|-id=449 bgcolor=#d6d6d6
| 457449 ||  || — || October 23, 2008 || Kitt Peak || Spacewatch || — || align=right | 2.9 km || 
|-id=450 bgcolor=#d6d6d6
| 457450 ||  || — || October 2, 2008 || Kitt Peak || Spacewatch || — || align=right | 2.9 km || 
|-id=451 bgcolor=#d6d6d6
| 457451 ||  || — || September 23, 2008 || Kitt Peak || Spacewatch || THM || align=right | 1.9 km || 
|-id=452 bgcolor=#fefefe
| 457452 ||  || — || September 22, 2008 || Kitt Peak || Spacewatch || — || align=right data-sort-value="0.63" | 630 m || 
|-id=453 bgcolor=#d6d6d6
| 457453 ||  || — || October 23, 2008 || Mount Lemmon || Mount Lemmon Survey || — || align=right | 2.7 km || 
|-id=454 bgcolor=#d6d6d6
| 457454 ||  || — || August 24, 2007 || Kitt Peak || Spacewatch || — || align=right | 3.7 km || 
|-id=455 bgcolor=#d6d6d6
| 457455 ||  || — || October 8, 2008 || Mount Lemmon || Mount Lemmon Survey || — || align=right | 3.0 km || 
|-id=456 bgcolor=#d6d6d6
| 457456 ||  || — || October 24, 2008 || Kitt Peak || Spacewatch || THM || align=right | 2.3 km || 
|-id=457 bgcolor=#d6d6d6
| 457457 ||  || — || October 24, 2008 || Kitt Peak || Spacewatch || EOS || align=right | 1.8 km || 
|-id=458 bgcolor=#d6d6d6
| 457458 ||  || — || October 24, 2008 || Kitt Peak || Spacewatch || LIX || align=right | 3.5 km || 
|-id=459 bgcolor=#d6d6d6
| 457459 ||  || — || October 24, 2008 || Catalina || CSS || — || align=right | 3.3 km || 
|-id=460 bgcolor=#fefefe
| 457460 ||  || — || October 24, 2008 || Mount Lemmon || Mount Lemmon Survey || — || align=right data-sort-value="0.65" | 650 m || 
|-id=461 bgcolor=#d6d6d6
| 457461 ||  || — || October 24, 2008 || Mount Lemmon || Mount Lemmon Survey || VER || align=right | 2.7 km || 
|-id=462 bgcolor=#fefefe
| 457462 ||  || — || October 24, 2008 || Mount Lemmon || Mount Lemmon Survey || — || align=right data-sort-value="0.66" | 660 m || 
|-id=463 bgcolor=#fefefe
| 457463 ||  || — || October 24, 2008 || Kitt Peak || Spacewatch || V || align=right data-sort-value="0.50" | 500 m || 
|-id=464 bgcolor=#d6d6d6
| 457464 ||  || — || October 23, 2008 || Kitt Peak || Spacewatch || — || align=right | 2.7 km || 
|-id=465 bgcolor=#d6d6d6
| 457465 ||  || — || September 23, 2008 || Mount Lemmon || Mount Lemmon Survey || — || align=right | 3.1 km || 
|-id=466 bgcolor=#fefefe
| 457466 ||  || — || September 29, 2008 || Mount Lemmon || Mount Lemmon Survey || — || align=right | 1.5 km || 
|-id=467 bgcolor=#fefefe
| 457467 ||  || — || October 24, 2008 || Kitt Peak || Spacewatch || V || align=right data-sort-value="0.50" | 500 m || 
|-id=468 bgcolor=#d6d6d6
| 457468 ||  || — || September 23, 2008 || Mount Lemmon || Mount Lemmon Survey || VER || align=right | 3.0 km || 
|-id=469 bgcolor=#fefefe
| 457469 ||  || — || October 25, 2008 || Kitt Peak || Spacewatch || — || align=right data-sort-value="0.56" | 560 m || 
|-id=470 bgcolor=#fefefe
| 457470 ||  || — || October 25, 2008 || Kitt Peak || Spacewatch || — || align=right data-sort-value="0.76" | 760 m || 
|-id=471 bgcolor=#d6d6d6
| 457471 ||  || — || October 25, 2008 || Kitt Peak || Spacewatch || — || align=right | 3.7 km || 
|-id=472 bgcolor=#fefefe
| 457472 ||  || — || October 25, 2008 || Kitt Peak || Spacewatch || — || align=right data-sort-value="0.74" | 740 m || 
|-id=473 bgcolor=#d6d6d6
| 457473 ||  || — || October 26, 2008 || Kitt Peak || Spacewatch || — || align=right | 2.6 km || 
|-id=474 bgcolor=#d6d6d6
| 457474 ||  || — || September 24, 2008 || Mount Lemmon || Mount Lemmon Survey || — || align=right | 2.6 km || 
|-id=475 bgcolor=#d6d6d6
| 457475 ||  || — || October 26, 2008 || Catalina || CSS || — || align=right | 3.5 km || 
|-id=476 bgcolor=#fefefe
| 457476 ||  || — || October 26, 2008 || Kitt Peak || Spacewatch || — || align=right data-sort-value="0.77" | 770 m || 
|-id=477 bgcolor=#fefefe
| 457477 ||  || — || October 26, 2008 || Kitt Peak || Spacewatch || — || align=right data-sort-value="0.63" | 630 m || 
|-id=478 bgcolor=#d6d6d6
| 457478 ||  || — || October 27, 2008 || Kitt Peak || Spacewatch || — || align=right | 3.2 km || 
|-id=479 bgcolor=#d6d6d6
| 457479 ||  || — || September 26, 2008 || Kitt Peak || Spacewatch || — || align=right | 2.9 km || 
|-id=480 bgcolor=#d6d6d6
| 457480 ||  || — || September 23, 2008 || Kitt Peak || Spacewatch || — || align=right | 2.8 km || 
|-id=481 bgcolor=#fefefe
| 457481 ||  || — || October 28, 2008 || Kitt Peak || Spacewatch || — || align=right data-sort-value="0.76" | 760 m || 
|-id=482 bgcolor=#d6d6d6
| 457482 ||  || — || September 23, 2008 || Mount Lemmon || Mount Lemmon Survey || — || align=right | 2.9 km || 
|-id=483 bgcolor=#fefefe
| 457483 ||  || — || September 6, 2008 || Mount Lemmon || Mount Lemmon Survey || — || align=right data-sort-value="0.62" | 620 m || 
|-id=484 bgcolor=#d6d6d6
| 457484 ||  || — || October 29, 2008 || Kitt Peak || Spacewatch || — || align=right | 4.3 km || 
|-id=485 bgcolor=#fefefe
| 457485 ||  || — || October 3, 2008 || Mount Lemmon || Mount Lemmon Survey || — || align=right data-sort-value="0.86" | 860 m || 
|-id=486 bgcolor=#d6d6d6
| 457486 ||  || — || September 29, 2008 || Mount Lemmon || Mount Lemmon Survey || — || align=right | 3.1 km || 
|-id=487 bgcolor=#fefefe
| 457487 ||  || — || October 30, 2008 || Kitt Peak || Spacewatch || — || align=right data-sort-value="0.53" | 530 m || 
|-id=488 bgcolor=#fefefe
| 457488 ||  || — || October 31, 2008 || Mount Lemmon || Mount Lemmon Survey || — || align=right data-sort-value="0.60" | 600 m || 
|-id=489 bgcolor=#fefefe
| 457489 ||  || — || September 23, 2008 || Mount Lemmon || Mount Lemmon Survey || — || align=right data-sort-value="0.62" | 620 m || 
|-id=490 bgcolor=#d6d6d6
| 457490 ||  || — || October 20, 2008 || Kitt Peak || Spacewatch || — || align=right | 3.5 km || 
|-id=491 bgcolor=#d6d6d6
| 457491 ||  || — || October 23, 2008 || Kitt Peak || Spacewatch || EOS || align=right | 2.1 km || 
|-id=492 bgcolor=#fefefe
| 457492 ||  || — || October 28, 2008 || Kitt Peak || Spacewatch || — || align=right data-sort-value="0.65" | 650 m || 
|-id=493 bgcolor=#d6d6d6
| 457493 ||  || — || October 28, 2008 || Kitt Peak || Spacewatch || VER || align=right | 4.1 km || 
|-id=494 bgcolor=#fefefe
| 457494 ||  || — || October 25, 2008 || Catalina || CSS || H || align=right data-sort-value="0.70" | 700 m || 
|-id=495 bgcolor=#fefefe
| 457495 ||  || — || October 24, 2008 || Socorro || LINEAR || — || align=right data-sort-value="0.63" | 630 m || 
|-id=496 bgcolor=#d6d6d6
| 457496 ||  || — || October 25, 2008 || Catalina || CSS || — || align=right | 3.9 km || 
|-id=497 bgcolor=#fefefe
| 457497 ||  || — || October 28, 2008 || Kitt Peak || Spacewatch || — || align=right data-sort-value="0.62" | 620 m || 
|-id=498 bgcolor=#FA8072
| 457498 ||  || — || September 24, 2008 || Mount Lemmon || Mount Lemmon Survey || — || align=right data-sort-value="0.75" | 750 m || 
|-id=499 bgcolor=#FA8072
| 457499 ||  || — || November 4, 2008 || Bisei SG Center || BATTeRS || — || align=right data-sort-value="0.61" | 610 m || 
|-id=500 bgcolor=#fefefe
| 457500 ||  || — || November 2, 2008 || Mount Lemmon || Mount Lemmon Survey || — || align=right data-sort-value="0.62" | 620 m || 
|}

457501–457600 

|-bgcolor=#fefefe
| 457501 ||  || — || November 1, 2008 || Kitt Peak || Spacewatch || — || align=right data-sort-value="0.52" | 520 m || 
|-id=502 bgcolor=#fefefe
| 457502 ||  || — || November 1, 2008 || Mount Lemmon || Mount Lemmon Survey || — || align=right data-sort-value="0.80" | 800 m || 
|-id=503 bgcolor=#d6d6d6
| 457503 ||  || — || November 1, 2008 || Kitt Peak || Spacewatch || — || align=right | 4.0 km || 
|-id=504 bgcolor=#d6d6d6
| 457504 ||  || — || November 2, 2008 || Mount Lemmon || Mount Lemmon Survey || — || align=right | 3.8 km || 
|-id=505 bgcolor=#d6d6d6
| 457505 ||  || — || November 2, 2008 || Mount Lemmon || Mount Lemmon Survey || VER || align=right | 2.7 km || 
|-id=506 bgcolor=#fefefe
| 457506 ||  || — || November 2, 2008 || Mount Lemmon || Mount Lemmon Survey || — || align=right data-sort-value="0.73" | 730 m || 
|-id=507 bgcolor=#fefefe
| 457507 ||  || — || November 6, 2008 || Kitt Peak || Spacewatch || — || align=right data-sort-value="0.68" | 680 m || 
|-id=508 bgcolor=#d6d6d6
| 457508 ||  || — || October 10, 2008 || Mount Lemmon || Mount Lemmon Survey || HYG || align=right | 2.5 km || 
|-id=509 bgcolor=#fefefe
| 457509 ||  || — || January 27, 2006 || Mount Lemmon || Mount Lemmon Survey || — || align=right data-sort-value="0.72" | 720 m || 
|-id=510 bgcolor=#d6d6d6
| 457510 ||  || — || November 8, 2008 || Kitt Peak || Spacewatch || — || align=right | 4.0 km || 
|-id=511 bgcolor=#d6d6d6
| 457511 ||  || — || October 23, 2008 || Kitt Peak || Spacewatch || EOS || align=right | 2.2 km || 
|-id=512 bgcolor=#d6d6d6
| 457512 ||  || — || November 8, 2008 || Mount Lemmon || Mount Lemmon Survey || — || align=right | 4.0 km || 
|-id=513 bgcolor=#fefefe
| 457513 ||  || — || November 1, 2008 || Mount Lemmon || Mount Lemmon Survey || — || align=right data-sort-value="0.60" | 600 m || 
|-id=514 bgcolor=#d6d6d6
| 457514 ||  || — || November 6, 2008 || Mount Lemmon || Mount Lemmon Survey || SYL7:4 || align=right | 3.7 km || 
|-id=515 bgcolor=#fefefe
| 457515 ||  || — || October 27, 2008 || Kitt Peak || Spacewatch || — || align=right data-sort-value="0.54" | 540 m || 
|-id=516 bgcolor=#fefefe
| 457516 ||  || — || January 7, 2006 || Mount Lemmon || Mount Lemmon Survey || — || align=right data-sort-value="0.48" | 480 m || 
|-id=517 bgcolor=#d6d6d6
| 457517 ||  || — || October 9, 2008 || Kitt Peak || Spacewatch || — || align=right | 3.7 km || 
|-id=518 bgcolor=#d6d6d6
| 457518 ||  || — || November 17, 2008 || Kitt Peak || Spacewatch || — || align=right | 4.4 km || 
|-id=519 bgcolor=#fefefe
| 457519 ||  || — || September 24, 2008 || Mount Lemmon || Mount Lemmon Survey || — || align=right data-sort-value="0.61" | 610 m || 
|-id=520 bgcolor=#d6d6d6
| 457520 ||  || — || November 17, 2008 || Kitt Peak || Spacewatch || — || align=right | 2.3 km || 
|-id=521 bgcolor=#fefefe
| 457521 ||  || — || November 18, 2008 || Kitt Peak || Spacewatch || — || align=right data-sort-value="0.67" | 670 m || 
|-id=522 bgcolor=#d6d6d6
| 457522 ||  || — || October 31, 2008 || Mount Lemmon || Mount Lemmon Survey || — || align=right | 3.2 km || 
|-id=523 bgcolor=#fefefe
| 457523 ||  || — || October 20, 2008 || Kitt Peak || Spacewatch || — || align=right data-sort-value="0.60" | 600 m || 
|-id=524 bgcolor=#d6d6d6
| 457524 ||  || — || November 17, 2008 || Kitt Peak || Spacewatch || — || align=right | 6.4 km || 
|-id=525 bgcolor=#d6d6d6
| 457525 ||  || — || October 28, 2008 || Kitt Peak || Spacewatch || — || align=right | 2.8 km || 
|-id=526 bgcolor=#fefefe
| 457526 ||  || — || November 17, 2008 || Kitt Peak || Spacewatch || — || align=right data-sort-value="0.74" | 740 m || 
|-id=527 bgcolor=#d6d6d6
| 457527 ||  || — || September 7, 2008 || Mount Lemmon || Mount Lemmon Survey || — || align=right | 2.9 km || 
|-id=528 bgcolor=#fefefe
| 457528 ||  || — || November 19, 2008 || Kitt Peak || Spacewatch || — || align=right data-sort-value="0.65" | 650 m || 
|-id=529 bgcolor=#fefefe
| 457529 ||  || — || November 20, 2008 || Kitt Peak || Spacewatch || — || align=right data-sort-value="0.76" | 760 m || 
|-id=530 bgcolor=#fefefe
| 457530 ||  || — || October 28, 2008 || Kitt Peak || Spacewatch || — || align=right data-sort-value="0.68" | 680 m || 
|-id=531 bgcolor=#fefefe
| 457531 ||  || — || November 18, 2008 || Kitt Peak || Spacewatch || — || align=right data-sort-value="0.68" | 680 m || 
|-id=532 bgcolor=#fefefe
| 457532 ||  || — || November 20, 2008 || Kitt Peak || Spacewatch || — || align=right data-sort-value="0.55" | 550 m || 
|-id=533 bgcolor=#fefefe
| 457533 ||  || — || November 20, 2008 || Kitt Peak || Spacewatch || — || align=right data-sort-value="0.71" | 710 m || 
|-id=534 bgcolor=#fefefe
| 457534 ||  || — || November 8, 2008 || Kitt Peak || Spacewatch || — || align=right data-sort-value="0.78" | 780 m || 
|-id=535 bgcolor=#d6d6d6
| 457535 ||  || — || October 23, 2008 || Kitt Peak || Spacewatch || — || align=right | 3.2 km || 
|-id=536 bgcolor=#fefefe
| 457536 ||  || — || November 29, 2005 || Kitt Peak || Spacewatch || — || align=right data-sort-value="0.64" | 640 m || 
|-id=537 bgcolor=#fefefe
| 457537 ||  || — || November 24, 2008 || Mount Lemmon || Mount Lemmon Survey || — || align=right data-sort-value="0.71" | 710 m || 
|-id=538 bgcolor=#fefefe
| 457538 ||  || — || November 30, 2008 || Mount Lemmon || Mount Lemmon Survey || — || align=right data-sort-value="0.58" | 580 m || 
|-id=539 bgcolor=#fefefe
| 457539 ||  || — || November 20, 2008 || Mount Lemmon || Mount Lemmon Survey || — || align=right data-sort-value="0.84" | 840 m || 
|-id=540 bgcolor=#fefefe
| 457540 ||  || — || November 20, 2008 || Kitt Peak || Spacewatch || — || align=right data-sort-value="0.65" | 650 m || 
|-id=541 bgcolor=#fefefe
| 457541 ||  || — || September 29, 2005 || Catalina || CSS || H || align=right data-sort-value="0.95" | 950 m || 
|-id=542 bgcolor=#fefefe
| 457542 ||  || — || November 19, 2008 || Kitt Peak || Spacewatch || — || align=right data-sort-value="0.67" | 670 m || 
|-id=543 bgcolor=#d6d6d6
| 457543 ||  || — || October 23, 2008 || Kitt Peak || Spacewatch || VER || align=right | 2.8 km || 
|-id=544 bgcolor=#fefefe
| 457544 ||  || — || April 2, 2006 || Kitt Peak || Spacewatch || — || align=right data-sort-value="0.58" | 580 m || 
|-id=545 bgcolor=#d6d6d6
| 457545 ||  || — || December 4, 2008 || Socorro || LINEAR || — || align=right | 4.0 km || 
|-id=546 bgcolor=#fefefe
| 457546 ||  || — || November 9, 2008 || Mount Lemmon || Mount Lemmon Survey || — || align=right data-sort-value="0.79" | 790 m || 
|-id=547 bgcolor=#fefefe
| 457547 ||  || — || October 7, 2004 || Kitt Peak || Spacewatch || — || align=right data-sort-value="0.57" | 570 m || 
|-id=548 bgcolor=#fefefe
| 457548 ||  || — || December 21, 2008 || Mount Lemmon || Mount Lemmon Survey || NYS || align=right data-sort-value="0.54" | 540 m || 
|-id=549 bgcolor=#fefefe
| 457549 ||  || — || December 4, 2008 || Kitt Peak || Spacewatch || — || align=right data-sort-value="0.58" | 580 m || 
|-id=550 bgcolor=#fefefe
| 457550 ||  || — || December 29, 2008 || Mount Lemmon || Mount Lemmon Survey || — || align=right data-sort-value="0.67" | 670 m || 
|-id=551 bgcolor=#fefefe
| 457551 ||  || — || December 30, 2008 || Mount Lemmon || Mount Lemmon Survey || — || align=right data-sort-value="0.82" | 820 m || 
|-id=552 bgcolor=#fefefe
| 457552 ||  || — || December 30, 2008 || Mount Lemmon || Mount Lemmon Survey || — || align=right data-sort-value="0.57" | 570 m || 
|-id=553 bgcolor=#fefefe
| 457553 ||  || — || December 30, 2008 || Mount Lemmon || Mount Lemmon Survey || — || align=right data-sort-value="0.75" | 750 m || 
|-id=554 bgcolor=#fefefe
| 457554 ||  || — || December 30, 2008 || Kitt Peak || Spacewatch || — || align=right data-sort-value="0.67" | 670 m || 
|-id=555 bgcolor=#d6d6d6
| 457555 ||  || — || December 22, 2008 || Kitt Peak || Spacewatch || — || align=right | 2.9 km || 
|-id=556 bgcolor=#fefefe
| 457556 ||  || — || December 29, 2008 || Kitt Peak || Spacewatch || — || align=right data-sort-value="0.72" | 720 m || 
|-id=557 bgcolor=#fefefe
| 457557 ||  || — || December 4, 2008 || Mount Lemmon || Mount Lemmon Survey || — || align=right data-sort-value="0.58" | 580 m || 
|-id=558 bgcolor=#fefefe
| 457558 ||  || — || December 4, 2008 || Mount Lemmon || Mount Lemmon Survey || — || align=right data-sort-value="0.61" | 610 m || 
|-id=559 bgcolor=#fefefe
| 457559 ||  || — || December 21, 2008 || Mount Lemmon || Mount Lemmon Survey || — || align=right data-sort-value="0.81" | 810 m || 
|-id=560 bgcolor=#fefefe
| 457560 ||  || — || November 1, 2008 || Kitt Peak || Spacewatch || V || align=right data-sort-value="0.73" | 730 m || 
|-id=561 bgcolor=#fefefe
| 457561 ||  || — || December 29, 2008 || Kitt Peak || Spacewatch || NYS || align=right data-sort-value="0.63" | 630 m || 
|-id=562 bgcolor=#fefefe
| 457562 ||  || — || December 29, 2008 || Kitt Peak || Spacewatch || — || align=right data-sort-value="0.66" | 660 m || 
|-id=563 bgcolor=#fefefe
| 457563 ||  || — || December 29, 2008 || Kitt Peak || Spacewatch || — || align=right data-sort-value="0.80" | 800 m || 
|-id=564 bgcolor=#fefefe
| 457564 ||  || — || December 29, 2008 || Kitt Peak || Spacewatch || — || align=right data-sort-value="0.73" | 730 m || 
|-id=565 bgcolor=#fefefe
| 457565 ||  || — || December 22, 2008 || Kitt Peak || Spacewatch || — || align=right data-sort-value="0.47" | 470 m || 
|-id=566 bgcolor=#fefefe
| 457566 ||  || — || December 30, 2008 || Kitt Peak || Spacewatch || (2076) || align=right data-sort-value="0.66" | 660 m || 
|-id=567 bgcolor=#fefefe
| 457567 ||  || — || December 30, 2008 || Kitt Peak || Spacewatch || — || align=right data-sort-value="0.77" | 770 m || 
|-id=568 bgcolor=#fefefe
| 457568 ||  || — || November 20, 2008 || Mount Lemmon || Mount Lemmon Survey || — || align=right data-sort-value="0.71" | 710 m || 
|-id=569 bgcolor=#fefefe
| 457569 ||  || — || November 24, 2008 || Mount Lemmon || Mount Lemmon Survey || — || align=right data-sort-value="0.62" | 620 m || 
|-id=570 bgcolor=#fefefe
| 457570 ||  || — || December 30, 2008 || Kitt Peak || Spacewatch || — || align=right data-sort-value="0.67" | 670 m || 
|-id=571 bgcolor=#fefefe
| 457571 ||  || — || November 7, 2008 || Mount Lemmon || Mount Lemmon Survey || — || align=right data-sort-value="0.77" | 770 m || 
|-id=572 bgcolor=#d6d6d6
| 457572 ||  || — || December 30, 2008 || Mount Lemmon || Mount Lemmon Survey || 7:4 || align=right | 3.3 km || 
|-id=573 bgcolor=#fefefe
| 457573 ||  || — || December 4, 2008 || Mount Lemmon || Mount Lemmon Survey || — || align=right data-sort-value="0.75" | 750 m || 
|-id=574 bgcolor=#fefefe
| 457574 ||  || — || December 30, 2008 || Mount Lemmon || Mount Lemmon Survey || — || align=right data-sort-value="0.84" | 840 m || 
|-id=575 bgcolor=#fefefe
| 457575 ||  || — || November 21, 2008 || Mount Lemmon || Mount Lemmon Survey || V || align=right data-sort-value="0.61" | 610 m || 
|-id=576 bgcolor=#fefefe
| 457576 ||  || — || December 22, 2008 || Mount Lemmon || Mount Lemmon Survey || — || align=right data-sort-value="0.83" | 830 m || 
|-id=577 bgcolor=#fefefe
| 457577 ||  || — || December 22, 2008 || Kitt Peak || Spacewatch || V || align=right data-sort-value="0.69" | 690 m || 
|-id=578 bgcolor=#fefefe
| 457578 ||  || — || December 22, 2008 || Mount Lemmon || Mount Lemmon Survey || — || align=right | 1.9 km || 
|-id=579 bgcolor=#fefefe
| 457579 ||  || — || December 22, 2008 || Kitt Peak || Spacewatch || V || align=right data-sort-value="0.44" | 440 m || 
|-id=580 bgcolor=#fefefe
| 457580 ||  || — || December 22, 2008 || Mount Lemmon || Mount Lemmon Survey || — || align=right data-sort-value="0.61" | 610 m || 
|-id=581 bgcolor=#fefefe
| 457581 ||  || — || December 29, 2008 || Mount Lemmon || Mount Lemmon Survey || NYS || align=right data-sort-value="0.48" | 480 m || 
|-id=582 bgcolor=#fefefe
| 457582 ||  || — || December 30, 2008 || Mount Lemmon || Mount Lemmon Survey || — || align=right data-sort-value="0.64" | 640 m || 
|-id=583 bgcolor=#fefefe
| 457583 ||  || — || December 22, 2008 || Kitt Peak || Spacewatch || — || align=right data-sort-value="0.54" | 540 m || 
|-id=584 bgcolor=#fefefe
| 457584 ||  || — || January 2, 2009 || Mount Lemmon || Mount Lemmon Survey || — || align=right data-sort-value="0.60" | 600 m || 
|-id=585 bgcolor=#fefefe
| 457585 ||  || — || December 21, 2008 || Kitt Peak || Spacewatch || NYS || align=right data-sort-value="0.51" | 510 m || 
|-id=586 bgcolor=#fefefe
| 457586 ||  || — || December 21, 2008 || Kitt Peak || Spacewatch || — || align=right data-sort-value="0.56" | 560 m || 
|-id=587 bgcolor=#fefefe
| 457587 ||  || — || November 24, 2008 || Mount Lemmon || Mount Lemmon Survey || — || align=right data-sort-value="0.69" | 690 m || 
|-id=588 bgcolor=#fefefe
| 457588 ||  || — || January 8, 2009 || Kitt Peak || Spacewatch || — || align=right data-sort-value="0.81" | 810 m || 
|-id=589 bgcolor=#fefefe
| 457589 ||  || — || November 24, 2008 || Mount Lemmon || Mount Lemmon Survey || — || align=right data-sort-value="0.74" | 740 m || 
|-id=590 bgcolor=#fefefe
| 457590 ||  || — || January 15, 2009 || Kitt Peak || Spacewatch || — || align=right data-sort-value="0.71" | 710 m || 
|-id=591 bgcolor=#fefefe
| 457591 ||  || — || January 15, 2009 || Kitt Peak || Spacewatch || — || align=right data-sort-value="0.67" | 670 m || 
|-id=592 bgcolor=#fefefe
| 457592 ||  || — || January 3, 2009 || Kitt Peak || Spacewatch || — || align=right data-sort-value="0.67" | 670 m || 
|-id=593 bgcolor=#fefefe
| 457593 ||  || — || January 15, 2009 || Kitt Peak || Spacewatch || — || align=right data-sort-value="0.62" | 620 m || 
|-id=594 bgcolor=#fefefe
| 457594 ||  || — || January 1, 2009 || Kitt Peak || Spacewatch || — || align=right | 1.0 km || 
|-id=595 bgcolor=#fefefe
| 457595 ||  || — || January 22, 2009 || Mayhill || A. Lowe || — || align=right data-sort-value="0.63" | 630 m || 
|-id=596 bgcolor=#fefefe
| 457596 ||  || — || December 30, 2008 || Mount Lemmon || Mount Lemmon Survey || — || align=right data-sort-value="0.75" | 750 m || 
|-id=597 bgcolor=#fefefe
| 457597 ||  || — || December 30, 2008 || Mount Lemmon || Mount Lemmon Survey || — || align=right data-sort-value="0.65" | 650 m || 
|-id=598 bgcolor=#fefefe
| 457598 ||  || — || January 16, 2009 || Kitt Peak || Spacewatch || — || align=right data-sort-value="0.53" | 530 m || 
|-id=599 bgcolor=#fefefe
| 457599 ||  || — || January 16, 2009 || Kitt Peak || Spacewatch || — || align=right data-sort-value="0.67" | 670 m || 
|-id=600 bgcolor=#fefefe
| 457600 ||  || — || January 16, 2009 || Kitt Peak || Spacewatch || — || align=right data-sort-value="0.80" | 800 m || 
|}

457601–457700 

|-bgcolor=#fefefe
| 457601 ||  || — || January 1, 2009 || Mount Lemmon || Mount Lemmon Survey || — || align=right data-sort-value="0.67" | 670 m || 
|-id=602 bgcolor=#fefefe
| 457602 ||  || — || January 16, 2009 || Kitt Peak || Spacewatch || — || align=right data-sort-value="0.56" | 560 m || 
|-id=603 bgcolor=#fefefe
| 457603 ||  || — || October 10, 2004 || Kitt Peak || Spacewatch || — || align=right data-sort-value="0.77" | 770 m || 
|-id=604 bgcolor=#fefefe
| 457604 ||  || — || January 16, 2009 || Kitt Peak || Spacewatch || — || align=right data-sort-value="0.70" | 700 m || 
|-id=605 bgcolor=#fefefe
| 457605 ||  || — || January 16, 2009 || Kitt Peak || Spacewatch || — || align=right data-sort-value="0.83" | 830 m || 
|-id=606 bgcolor=#fefefe
| 457606 ||  || — || January 16, 2009 || Kitt Peak || Spacewatch || — || align=right data-sort-value="0.53" | 530 m || 
|-id=607 bgcolor=#fefefe
| 457607 ||  || — || January 16, 2009 || Mount Lemmon || Mount Lemmon Survey || — || align=right data-sort-value="0.64" | 640 m || 
|-id=608 bgcolor=#fefefe
| 457608 ||  || — || January 16, 2009 || Mount Lemmon || Mount Lemmon Survey || — || align=right data-sort-value="0.68" | 680 m || 
|-id=609 bgcolor=#fefefe
| 457609 ||  || — || January 20, 2009 || Kitt Peak || Spacewatch || — || align=right data-sort-value="0.74" | 740 m || 
|-id=610 bgcolor=#fefefe
| 457610 ||  || — || January 20, 2009 || Kitt Peak || Spacewatch || H || align=right data-sort-value="0.67" | 670 m || 
|-id=611 bgcolor=#fefefe
| 457611 ||  || — || December 7, 2004 || Socorro || LINEAR || — || align=right data-sort-value="0.83" | 830 m || 
|-id=612 bgcolor=#fefefe
| 457612 ||  || — || December 22, 2008 || Mount Lemmon || Mount Lemmon Survey || — || align=right | 2.8 km || 
|-id=613 bgcolor=#fefefe
| 457613 ||  || — || December 3, 2008 || Mount Lemmon || Mount Lemmon Survey || — || align=right data-sort-value="0.83" | 830 m || 
|-id=614 bgcolor=#fefefe
| 457614 ||  || — || September 15, 2007 || Kitt Peak || Spacewatch || — || align=right data-sort-value="0.89" | 890 m || 
|-id=615 bgcolor=#fefefe
| 457615 ||  || — || January 25, 2009 || Kitt Peak || Spacewatch || — || align=right data-sort-value="0.75" | 750 m || 
|-id=616 bgcolor=#fefefe
| 457616 ||  || — || January 25, 2009 || Kitt Peak || Spacewatch || — || align=right data-sort-value="0.82" | 820 m || 
|-id=617 bgcolor=#fefefe
| 457617 ||  || — || January 25, 2009 || Kitt Peak || Spacewatch || — || align=right data-sort-value="0.66" | 660 m || 
|-id=618 bgcolor=#fefefe
| 457618 ||  || — || December 30, 2008 || Mount Lemmon || Mount Lemmon Survey || — || align=right data-sort-value="0.62" | 620 m || 
|-id=619 bgcolor=#E9E9E9
| 457619 ||  || — || December 3, 2008 || Mount Lemmon || Mount Lemmon Survey || — || align=right | 2.8 km || 
|-id=620 bgcolor=#fefefe
| 457620 ||  || — || January 25, 2009 || Kitt Peak || Spacewatch || V || align=right data-sort-value="0.49" | 490 m || 
|-id=621 bgcolor=#fefefe
| 457621 ||  || — || January 25, 2009 || Kitt Peak || Spacewatch || — || align=right data-sort-value="0.56" | 560 m || 
|-id=622 bgcolor=#fefefe
| 457622 ||  || — || December 22, 2008 || Mount Lemmon || Mount Lemmon Survey || MAS || align=right data-sort-value="0.62" | 620 m || 
|-id=623 bgcolor=#fefefe
| 457623 ||  || — || January 28, 2009 || Catalina || CSS || — || align=right data-sort-value="0.67" | 670 m || 
|-id=624 bgcolor=#fefefe
| 457624 ||  || — || January 29, 2009 || Kitt Peak || Spacewatch || (2076) || align=right data-sort-value="0.92" | 920 m || 
|-id=625 bgcolor=#fefefe
| 457625 ||  || — || January 25, 2009 || Kitt Peak || Spacewatch || — || align=right data-sort-value="0.63" | 630 m || 
|-id=626 bgcolor=#fefefe
| 457626 ||  || — || January 30, 2009 || Mount Lemmon || Mount Lemmon Survey || — || align=right data-sort-value="0.81" | 810 m || 
|-id=627 bgcolor=#fefefe
| 457627 ||  || — || December 30, 2008 || Kitt Peak || Spacewatch || — || align=right data-sort-value="0.63" | 630 m || 
|-id=628 bgcolor=#fefefe
| 457628 ||  || — || January 31, 2009 || Kitt Peak || Spacewatch || — || align=right data-sort-value="0.73" | 730 m || 
|-id=629 bgcolor=#fefefe
| 457629 ||  || — || January 29, 2009 || Kitt Peak || Spacewatch || — || align=right data-sort-value="0.59" | 590 m || 
|-id=630 bgcolor=#fefefe
| 457630 ||  || — || January 30, 2009 || Mount Lemmon || Mount Lemmon Survey || — || align=right data-sort-value="0.52" | 520 m || 
|-id=631 bgcolor=#fefefe
| 457631 ||  || — || January 16, 2009 || Kitt Peak || Spacewatch || — || align=right data-sort-value="0.61" | 610 m || 
|-id=632 bgcolor=#fefefe
| 457632 ||  || — || January 29, 2009 || Kitt Peak || Spacewatch || — || align=right data-sort-value="0.50" | 500 m || 
|-id=633 bgcolor=#fefefe
| 457633 ||  || — || January 30, 2009 || Kitt Peak || Spacewatch || — || align=right data-sort-value="0.55" | 550 m || 
|-id=634 bgcolor=#fefefe
| 457634 ||  || — || January 15, 2009 || Kitt Peak || Spacewatch || V || align=right data-sort-value="0.59" | 590 m || 
|-id=635 bgcolor=#fefefe
| 457635 ||  || — || January 30, 2009 || Mount Lemmon || Mount Lemmon Survey || — || align=right data-sort-value="0.86" | 860 m || 
|-id=636 bgcolor=#fefefe
| 457636 ||  || — || January 16, 2009 || Mount Lemmon || Mount Lemmon Survey || — || align=right data-sort-value="0.76" | 760 m || 
|-id=637 bgcolor=#fefefe
| 457637 ||  || — || January 31, 2009 || Kitt Peak || Spacewatch || — || align=right data-sort-value="0.64" | 640 m || 
|-id=638 bgcolor=#fefefe
| 457638 ||  || — || January 25, 2009 || Kitt Peak || Spacewatch || NYS || align=right data-sort-value="0.60" | 600 m || 
|-id=639 bgcolor=#fefefe
| 457639 ||  || — || January 31, 2009 || Kitt Peak || Spacewatch || — || align=right data-sort-value="0.73" | 730 m || 
|-id=640 bgcolor=#fefefe
| 457640 ||  || — || January 25, 2009 || Kitt Peak || Spacewatch || — || align=right data-sort-value="0.76" | 760 m || 
|-id=641 bgcolor=#fefefe
| 457641 ||  || — || December 9, 2004 || Kitt Peak || Spacewatch || NYS || align=right data-sort-value="0.50" | 500 m || 
|-id=642 bgcolor=#fefefe
| 457642 ||  || — || January 31, 2009 || Mount Lemmon || Mount Lemmon Survey || MAS || align=right data-sort-value="0.63" | 630 m || 
|-id=643 bgcolor=#fefefe
| 457643 ||  || — || January 18, 2009 || Kitt Peak || Spacewatch || — || align=right data-sort-value="0.84" | 840 m || 
|-id=644 bgcolor=#fefefe
| 457644 ||  || — || January 25, 2009 || Socorro || LINEAR || — || align=right data-sort-value="0.71" | 710 m || 
|-id=645 bgcolor=#fefefe
| 457645 ||  || — || January 31, 2009 || Kitt Peak || Spacewatch || — || align=right data-sort-value="0.49" | 490 m || 
|-id=646 bgcolor=#fefefe
| 457646 ||  || — || January 3, 2009 || Mount Lemmon || Mount Lemmon Survey || NYS || align=right data-sort-value="0.51" | 510 m || 
|-id=647 bgcolor=#FFC2E0
| 457647 ||  || — || February 3, 2009 || Catalina || CSS || APO +1kmcritical || align=right | 2.0 km || 
|-id=648 bgcolor=#fefefe
| 457648 ||  || — || February 13, 2009 || Calar Alto || F. Hormuth || — || align=right data-sort-value="0.75" | 750 m || 
|-id=649 bgcolor=#fefefe
| 457649 ||  || — || December 22, 2008 || Mount Lemmon || Mount Lemmon Survey || — || align=right data-sort-value="0.67" | 670 m || 
|-id=650 bgcolor=#fefefe
| 457650 ||  || — || February 1, 2009 || Kitt Peak || Spacewatch || — || align=right data-sort-value="0.73" | 730 m || 
|-id=651 bgcolor=#fefefe
| 457651 ||  || — || January 25, 2009 || Kitt Peak || Spacewatch || — || align=right data-sort-value="0.72" | 720 m || 
|-id=652 bgcolor=#fefefe
| 457652 ||  || — || January 17, 2009 || Kitt Peak || Spacewatch || NYS || align=right data-sort-value="0.49" | 490 m || 
|-id=653 bgcolor=#fefefe
| 457653 ||  || — || December 31, 2008 || Mount Lemmon || Mount Lemmon Survey || — || align=right data-sort-value="0.63" | 630 m || 
|-id=654 bgcolor=#fefefe
| 457654 ||  || — || February 2, 2009 || Mount Lemmon || Mount Lemmon Survey || — || align=right data-sort-value="0.58" | 580 m || 
|-id=655 bgcolor=#fefefe
| 457655 ||  || — || February 13, 2009 || Kitt Peak || Spacewatch || — || align=right data-sort-value="0.64" | 640 m || 
|-id=656 bgcolor=#fefefe
| 457656 ||  || — || January 15, 2009 || Kitt Peak || Spacewatch || NYS || align=right data-sort-value="0.58" | 580 m || 
|-id=657 bgcolor=#fefefe
| 457657 ||  || — || January 25, 2009 || Kitt Peak || Spacewatch || — || align=right data-sort-value="0.59" | 590 m || 
|-id=658 bgcolor=#fefefe
| 457658 ||  || — || February 14, 2009 || Kitt Peak || Spacewatch || — || align=right data-sort-value="0.74" | 740 m || 
|-id=659 bgcolor=#fefefe
| 457659 ||  || — || January 25, 2009 || Catalina || CSS || — || align=right data-sort-value="0.93" | 930 m || 
|-id=660 bgcolor=#fefefe
| 457660 ||  || — || February 14, 2009 || Mount Lemmon || Mount Lemmon Survey || — || align=right data-sort-value="0.56" | 560 m || 
|-id=661 bgcolor=#fefefe
| 457661 ||  || — || February 1, 2009 || Kitt Peak || Spacewatch || NYS || align=right data-sort-value="0.48" | 480 m || 
|-id=662 bgcolor=#FFC2E0
| 457662 ||  || — || February 18, 2009 || Socorro || LINEAR || APOPHAcritical || align=right data-sort-value="0.14" | 140 m || 
|-id=663 bgcolor=#FFC2E0
| 457663 ||  || — || February 19, 2009 || Socorro || LINEAR || AMOcritical || align=right data-sort-value="0.31" | 310 m || 
|-id=664 bgcolor=#fefefe
| 457664 ||  || — || January 3, 2009 || Mount Lemmon || Mount Lemmon Survey || — || align=right data-sort-value="0.85" | 850 m || 
|-id=665 bgcolor=#fefefe
| 457665 ||  || — || February 16, 2009 || La Sagra || OAM Obs. || — || align=right data-sort-value="0.79" | 790 m || 
|-id=666 bgcolor=#fefefe
| 457666 ||  || — || January 29, 2009 || Catalina || CSS || — || align=right data-sort-value="0.70" | 700 m || 
|-id=667 bgcolor=#fefefe
| 457667 ||  || — || February 1, 2009 || Mount Lemmon || Mount Lemmon Survey || — || align=right data-sort-value="0.73" | 730 m || 
|-id=668 bgcolor=#fefefe
| 457668 ||  || — || February 20, 2009 || Kitt Peak || Spacewatch || — || align=right data-sort-value="0.61" | 610 m || 
|-id=669 bgcolor=#fefefe
| 457669 ||  || — || February 25, 2009 || Dauban || F. Kugel || V || align=right data-sort-value="0.60" | 600 m || 
|-id=670 bgcolor=#fefefe
| 457670 ||  || — || January 17, 2009 || Kitt Peak || Spacewatch || — || align=right data-sort-value="0.85" | 850 m || 
|-id=671 bgcolor=#fefefe
| 457671 ||  || — || February 19, 2009 || Kitt Peak || Spacewatch || NYS || align=right data-sort-value="0.68" | 680 m || 
|-id=672 bgcolor=#fefefe
| 457672 ||  || — || February 19, 2009 || Kitt Peak || Spacewatch || — || align=right data-sort-value="0.80" | 800 m || 
|-id=673 bgcolor=#fefefe
| 457673 ||  || — || February 19, 2009 || Kitt Peak || Spacewatch || MAS || align=right data-sort-value="0.66" | 660 m || 
|-id=674 bgcolor=#fefefe
| 457674 ||  || — || February 22, 2009 || Kitt Peak || Spacewatch || — || align=right data-sort-value="0.67" | 670 m || 
|-id=675 bgcolor=#fefefe
| 457675 ||  || — || January 17, 2009 || Kitt Peak || Spacewatch || MAS || align=right data-sort-value="0.72" | 720 m || 
|-id=676 bgcolor=#fefefe
| 457676 ||  || — || January 18, 2009 || Mount Lemmon || Mount Lemmon Survey || — || align=right data-sort-value="0.70" | 700 m || 
|-id=677 bgcolor=#fefefe
| 457677 ||  || — || February 24, 2009 || Catalina || CSS || — || align=right | 1.0 km || 
|-id=678 bgcolor=#fefefe
| 457678 ||  || — || January 17, 2009 || Kitt Peak || Spacewatch || — || align=right data-sort-value="0.64" | 640 m || 
|-id=679 bgcolor=#fefefe
| 457679 ||  || — || February 24, 2009 || Kitt Peak || Spacewatch || NYS || align=right data-sort-value="0.50" | 500 m || 
|-id=680 bgcolor=#fefefe
| 457680 ||  || — || February 24, 2009 || Kitt Peak || Spacewatch || MAS || align=right data-sort-value="0.68" | 680 m || 
|-id=681 bgcolor=#fefefe
| 457681 ||  || — || November 21, 2003 || Kitt Peak || Spacewatch || — || align=right data-sort-value="0.94" | 940 m || 
|-id=682 bgcolor=#fefefe
| 457682 ||  || — || February 27, 2009 || Kitt Peak || Spacewatch || — || align=right data-sort-value="0.84" | 840 m || 
|-id=683 bgcolor=#fefefe
| 457683 ||  || — || February 27, 2009 || Kitt Peak || Spacewatch || — || align=right data-sort-value="0.67" | 670 m || 
|-id=684 bgcolor=#fefefe
| 457684 ||  || — || February 26, 2009 || Kitt Peak || Spacewatch || — || align=right data-sort-value="0.58" | 580 m || 
|-id=685 bgcolor=#fefefe
| 457685 ||  || — || February 26, 2009 || Kitt Peak || Spacewatch || — || align=right data-sort-value="0.88" | 880 m || 
|-id=686 bgcolor=#fefefe
| 457686 ||  || — || January 3, 2009 || Mount Lemmon || Mount Lemmon Survey || V || align=right data-sort-value="0.63" | 630 m || 
|-id=687 bgcolor=#fefefe
| 457687 ||  || — || January 25, 2009 || Kitt Peak || Spacewatch || NYS || align=right data-sort-value="0.48" | 480 m || 
|-id=688 bgcolor=#fefefe
| 457688 ||  || — || February 26, 2009 || Kitt Peak || Spacewatch || MAS || align=right data-sort-value="0.66" | 660 m || 
|-id=689 bgcolor=#fefefe
| 457689 ||  || — || February 27, 2009 || Mount Lemmon || Mount Lemmon Survey || — || align=right data-sort-value="0.94" | 940 m || 
|-id=690 bgcolor=#fefefe
| 457690 ||  || — || February 28, 2009 || Kitt Peak || Spacewatch || — || align=right data-sort-value="0.65" | 650 m || 
|-id=691 bgcolor=#fefefe
| 457691 ||  || — || October 26, 2008 || Mount Lemmon || Mount Lemmon Survey || — || align=right data-sort-value="0.97" | 970 m || 
|-id=692 bgcolor=#fefefe
| 457692 ||  || — || December 30, 2008 || Mount Lemmon || Mount Lemmon Survey || — || align=right data-sort-value="0.99" | 990 m || 
|-id=693 bgcolor=#fefefe
| 457693 ||  || — || March 15, 2009 || La Sagra || OAM Obs. || — || align=right data-sort-value="0.82" | 820 m || 
|-id=694 bgcolor=#fefefe
| 457694 ||  || — || February 20, 2009 || Mount Lemmon || Mount Lemmon Survey || NYS || align=right data-sort-value="0.65" | 650 m || 
|-id=695 bgcolor=#fefefe
| 457695 ||  || — || March 15, 2009 || Kitt Peak || Spacewatch || NYS || align=right data-sort-value="0.53" | 530 m || 
|-id=696 bgcolor=#fefefe
| 457696 ||  || — || February 1, 2009 || Catalina || CSS || — || align=right data-sort-value="0.64" | 640 m || 
|-id=697 bgcolor=#fefefe
| 457697 ||  || — || March 15, 2009 || Kitt Peak || Spacewatch || — || align=right data-sort-value="0.72" | 720 m || 
|-id=698 bgcolor=#fefefe
| 457698 ||  || — || February 2, 2009 || Kitt Peak || Spacewatch || — || align=right data-sort-value="0.73" | 730 m || 
|-id=699 bgcolor=#fefefe
| 457699 ||  || — || March 3, 2009 || Kitt Peak || Spacewatch || — || align=right data-sort-value="0.63" | 630 m || 
|-id=700 bgcolor=#fefefe
| 457700 ||  || — || March 3, 2009 || Mount Lemmon || Mount Lemmon Survey || MAS || align=right data-sort-value="0.58" | 580 m || 
|}

457701–457800 

|-bgcolor=#fefefe
| 457701 ||  || — || March 3, 2009 || Mount Lemmon || Mount Lemmon Survey || — || align=right data-sort-value="0.61" | 610 m || 
|-id=702 bgcolor=#fefefe
| 457702 ||  || — || March 2, 2009 || Mount Lemmon || Mount Lemmon Survey || NYS || align=right data-sort-value="0.69" | 690 m || 
|-id=703 bgcolor=#fefefe
| 457703 ||  || — || March 16, 2009 || La Sagra || OAM Obs. || — || align=right data-sort-value="0.91" | 910 m || 
|-id=704 bgcolor=#fefefe
| 457704 ||  || — || February 1, 2009 || Kitt Peak || Spacewatch || V || align=right data-sort-value="0.57" | 570 m || 
|-id=705 bgcolor=#fefefe
| 457705 ||  || — || February 26, 2009 || Catalina || CSS || H || align=right data-sort-value="0.62" | 620 m || 
|-id=706 bgcolor=#fefefe
| 457706 ||  || — || March 3, 2009 || Kitt Peak || Spacewatch || — || align=right data-sort-value="0.81" | 810 m || 
|-id=707 bgcolor=#fefefe
| 457707 ||  || — || March 19, 2009 || Pla D'Arguines || R. Ferrando || — || align=right data-sort-value="0.82" | 820 m || 
|-id=708 bgcolor=#fefefe
| 457708 ||  || — || March 20, 2009 || Heppenheim || Starkenburg Obs. || MAS || align=right data-sort-value="0.68" | 680 m || 
|-id=709 bgcolor=#fefefe
| 457709 ||  || — || March 19, 2009 || Kitt Peak || Spacewatch || — || align=right data-sort-value="0.82" | 820 m || 
|-id=710 bgcolor=#fefefe
| 457710 ||  || — || March 22, 2009 || Catalina || CSS || — || align=right data-sort-value="0.92" | 920 m || 
|-id=711 bgcolor=#fefefe
| 457711 ||  || — || January 2, 2009 || Catalina || CSS || — || align=right | 1.1 km || 
|-id=712 bgcolor=#fefefe
| 457712 ||  || — || March 21, 2009 || Kitt Peak || Spacewatch || — || align=right data-sort-value="0.86" | 860 m || 
|-id=713 bgcolor=#fefefe
| 457713 ||  || — || March 27, 2009 || Catalina || CSS || — || align=right data-sort-value="0.83" | 830 m || 
|-id=714 bgcolor=#fefefe
| 457714 ||  || — || February 19, 2009 || Kitt Peak || Spacewatch || MAS || align=right data-sort-value="0.65" | 650 m || 
|-id=715 bgcolor=#fefefe
| 457715 ||  || — || March 26, 2009 || Catalina || CSS || — || align=right | 1.1 km || 
|-id=716 bgcolor=#fefefe
| 457716 ||  || — || March 27, 2009 || Catalina || CSS || — || align=right data-sort-value="0.62" | 620 m || 
|-id=717 bgcolor=#fefefe
| 457717 ||  || — || February 14, 2009 || Mount Lemmon || Mount Lemmon Survey || — || align=right data-sort-value="0.64" | 640 m || 
|-id=718 bgcolor=#fefefe
| 457718 ||  || — || February 24, 2009 || Kitt Peak || Spacewatch || NYS || align=right data-sort-value="0.62" | 620 m || 
|-id=719 bgcolor=#fefefe
| 457719 ||  || — || March 16, 2009 || Catalina || CSS || — || align=right | 2.7 km || 
|-id=720 bgcolor=#fefefe
| 457720 ||  || — || March 7, 2009 || Mount Lemmon || Mount Lemmon Survey || — || align=right data-sort-value="0.73" | 730 m || 
|-id=721 bgcolor=#fefefe
| 457721 ||  || — || March 21, 2009 || La Sagra || OAM Obs. || — || align=right data-sort-value="0.74" | 740 m || 
|-id=722 bgcolor=#fefefe
| 457722 ||  || — || March 28, 2009 || Kitt Peak || Spacewatch || — || align=right data-sort-value="0.82" | 820 m || 
|-id=723 bgcolor=#fefefe
| 457723 ||  || — || March 28, 2009 || Kitt Peak || Spacewatch || — || align=right data-sort-value="0.66" | 660 m || 
|-id=724 bgcolor=#fefefe
| 457724 ||  || — || March 18, 2009 || Kitt Peak || Spacewatch || V || align=right data-sort-value="0.60" | 600 m || 
|-id=725 bgcolor=#fefefe
| 457725 ||  || — || March 19, 2009 || Kitt Peak || Spacewatch || — || align=right data-sort-value="0.73" | 730 m || 
|-id=726 bgcolor=#fefefe
| 457726 ||  || — || March 31, 2009 || Kitt Peak || Spacewatch || MAS || align=right data-sort-value="0.65" | 650 m || 
|-id=727 bgcolor=#fefefe
| 457727 ||  || — || March 29, 2009 || Kitt Peak || Spacewatch || NYS || align=right data-sort-value="0.69" | 690 m || 
|-id=728 bgcolor=#fefefe
| 457728 ||  || — || March 18, 2009 || Kitt Peak || Spacewatch || — || align=right data-sort-value="0.71" | 710 m || 
|-id=729 bgcolor=#d6d6d6
| 457729 ||  || — || March 19, 2009 || Catalina || CSS || — || align=right | 3.6 km || 
|-id=730 bgcolor=#fefefe
| 457730 ||  || — || March 19, 2009 || Kitt Peak || Spacewatch || — || align=right data-sort-value="0.75" | 750 m || 
|-id=731 bgcolor=#fefefe
| 457731 ||  || — || March 31, 2009 || Kitt Peak || Spacewatch || NYS || align=right data-sort-value="0.57" | 570 m || 
|-id=732 bgcolor=#fefefe
| 457732 ||  || — || April 15, 2009 || Črni Vrh || Črni Vrh || — || align=right data-sort-value="0.93" | 930 m || 
|-id=733 bgcolor=#fefefe
| 457733 ||  || — || April 16, 2009 || Catalina || CSS || — || align=right data-sort-value="0.84" | 840 m || 
|-id=734 bgcolor=#fefefe
| 457734 ||  || — || April 16, 2009 || Catalina || CSS || — || align=right | 1.0 km || 
|-id=735 bgcolor=#fefefe
| 457735 ||  || — || March 22, 2009 || Catalina || CSS || — || align=right | 1.2 km || 
|-id=736 bgcolor=#d6d6d6
| 457736 ||  || — || April 17, 2009 || Kitt Peak || Spacewatch || 3:2 || align=right | 4.3 km || 
|-id=737 bgcolor=#fefefe
| 457737 ||  || — || April 17, 2009 || Mount Lemmon || Mount Lemmon Survey || — || align=right | 1.2 km || 
|-id=738 bgcolor=#fefefe
| 457738 ||  || — || March 29, 2009 || Kitt Peak || Spacewatch || — || align=right data-sort-value="0.72" | 720 m || 
|-id=739 bgcolor=#fefefe
| 457739 ||  || — || April 17, 2009 || Catalina || CSS || NYS || align=right data-sort-value="0.68" | 680 m || 
|-id=740 bgcolor=#fefefe
| 457740 ||  || — || April 18, 2009 || Kitt Peak || Spacewatch || NYS || align=right data-sort-value="0.61" | 610 m || 
|-id=741 bgcolor=#fefefe
| 457741 ||  || — || March 29, 2009 || Mount Lemmon || Mount Lemmon Survey || — || align=right | 1.0 km || 
|-id=742 bgcolor=#fefefe
| 457742 ||  || — || October 16, 2007 || Kitt Peak || Spacewatch || — || align=right data-sort-value="0.73" | 730 m || 
|-id=743 bgcolor=#fefefe
| 457743 Balklavs ||  ||  || April 18, 2009 || Baldone || K. Černis, I. Eglītis || NYS || align=right data-sort-value="0.59" | 590 m || 
|-id=744 bgcolor=#fefefe
| 457744 ||  || — || April 17, 2009 || Kitt Peak || Spacewatch || — || align=right data-sort-value="0.83" | 830 m || 
|-id=745 bgcolor=#fefefe
| 457745 ||  || — || April 20, 2009 || Kitt Peak || Spacewatch || — || align=right data-sort-value="0.91" | 910 m || 
|-id=746 bgcolor=#fefefe
| 457746 ||  || — || April 20, 2009 || Kitt Peak || Spacewatch || NYS || align=right data-sort-value="0.76" | 760 m || 
|-id=747 bgcolor=#fefefe
| 457747 ||  || — || February 4, 2009 || Kitt Peak || Spacewatch || — || align=right data-sort-value="0.98" | 980 m || 
|-id=748 bgcolor=#E9E9E9
| 457748 ||  || — || April 20, 2009 || Kitt Peak || Spacewatch || — || align=right | 1.0 km || 
|-id=749 bgcolor=#fefefe
| 457749 ||  || — || April 18, 2009 || Kitt Peak || Spacewatch || NYS || align=right data-sort-value="0.76" | 760 m || 
|-id=750 bgcolor=#fefefe
| 457750 ||  || — || March 30, 2009 || Mount Lemmon || Mount Lemmon Survey || — || align=right data-sort-value="0.69" | 690 m || 
|-id=751 bgcolor=#fefefe
| 457751 ||  || — || April 22, 2009 || Kitt Peak || Spacewatch || — || align=right data-sort-value="0.72" | 720 m || 
|-id=752 bgcolor=#fefefe
| 457752 ||  || — || April 27, 2009 || Tzec Maun || E. Schwab || V || align=right data-sort-value="0.57" | 570 m || 
|-id=753 bgcolor=#fefefe
| 457753 ||  || — || April 22, 2009 || Mount Lemmon || Mount Lemmon Survey || — || align=right data-sort-value="0.72" | 720 m || 
|-id=754 bgcolor=#fefefe
| 457754 ||  || — || April 28, 2009 || Catalina || CSS || — || align=right data-sort-value="0.83" | 830 m || 
|-id=755 bgcolor=#fefefe
| 457755 ||  || — || April 28, 2009 || Catalina || CSS || — || align=right data-sort-value="0.86" | 860 m || 
|-id=756 bgcolor=#fefefe
| 457756 ||  || — || March 24, 2009 || Mount Lemmon || Mount Lemmon Survey || — || align=right | 1.0 km || 
|-id=757 bgcolor=#fefefe
| 457757 ||  || — || April 30, 2009 || La Sagra || OAM Obs. || — || align=right data-sort-value="0.73" | 730 m || 
|-id=758 bgcolor=#fefefe
| 457758 ||  || — || April 20, 2009 || Mount Lemmon || Mount Lemmon Survey || — || align=right data-sort-value="0.74" | 740 m || 
|-id=759 bgcolor=#fefefe
| 457759 ||  || — || April 23, 2009 || Kitt Peak || Spacewatch || — || align=right data-sort-value="0.82" | 820 m || 
|-id=760 bgcolor=#fefefe
| 457760 ||  || — || April 23, 2009 || Kitt Peak || Spacewatch || — || align=right data-sort-value="0.75" | 750 m || 
|-id=761 bgcolor=#fefefe
| 457761 ||  || — || March 31, 2009 || Mount Lemmon || Mount Lemmon Survey || — || align=right data-sort-value="0.87" | 870 m || 
|-id=762 bgcolor=#C2FFFF
| 457762 ||  || — || May 13, 2009 || Kitt Peak || Spacewatch || L5 || align=right | 8.0 km || 
|-id=763 bgcolor=#fefefe
| 457763 ||  || — || April 20, 2009 || Catalina || CSS || — || align=right data-sort-value="0.88" | 880 m || 
|-id=764 bgcolor=#E9E9E9
| 457764 ||  || — || May 15, 2009 || Kitt Peak || Spacewatch || EUN || align=right data-sort-value="0.94" | 940 m || 
|-id=765 bgcolor=#E9E9E9
| 457765 ||  || — || May 1, 2009 || Kitt Peak || Spacewatch || — || align=right | 1.5 km || 
|-id=766 bgcolor=#fefefe
| 457766 ||  || — || May 20, 2009 || La Sagra || OAM Obs. || — || align=right | 1.0 km || 
|-id=767 bgcolor=#fefefe
| 457767 ||  || — || May 24, 2009 || Catalina || CSS || — || align=right | 1.0 km || 
|-id=768 bgcolor=#FFC2E0
| 457768 ||  || — || May 23, 2009 || Siding Spring || SSS || APOPHA || align=right data-sort-value="0.75" | 750 m || 
|-id=769 bgcolor=#fefefe
| 457769 ||  || — || May 22, 2009 || Bergisch Gladbach || W. Bickel || NYS || align=right data-sort-value="0.65" | 650 m || 
|-id=770 bgcolor=#C2FFFF
| 457770 ||  || — || May 25, 2009 || Mount Lemmon || Mount Lemmon Survey || L5 || align=right | 8.9 km || 
|-id=771 bgcolor=#E9E9E9
| 457771 ||  || — || April 24, 2009 || Kitt Peak || Spacewatch || EUN || align=right | 1.2 km || 
|-id=772 bgcolor=#fefefe
| 457772 ||  || — || April 19, 2009 || Kitt Peak || Spacewatch || — || align=right | 4.0 km || 
|-id=773 bgcolor=#E9E9E9
| 457773 ||  || — || May 13, 2009 || Mount Lemmon || Mount Lemmon Survey || — || align=right | 2.5 km || 
|-id=774 bgcolor=#fefefe
| 457774 ||  || — || June 16, 2009 || Kitt Peak || Spacewatch || — || align=right | 3.3 km || 
|-id=775 bgcolor=#E9E9E9
| 457775 ||  || — || June 28, 2009 || La Sagra || OAM Obs. || JUN || align=right | 1.2 km || 
|-id=776 bgcolor=#d6d6d6
| 457776 ||  || — || July 14, 2009 || Kitt Peak || Spacewatch || — || align=right | 2.6 km || 
|-id=777 bgcolor=#fefefe
| 457777 ||  || — || July 19, 2009 || La Sagra || OAM Obs. || H || align=right data-sort-value="0.77" | 770 m || 
|-id=778 bgcolor=#E9E9E9
| 457778 ||  || — || July 22, 2009 || La Sagra || OAM Obs. || — || align=right | 2.2 km || 
|-id=779 bgcolor=#E9E9E9
| 457779 ||  || — || July 29, 2009 || La Sagra || OAM Obs. || — || align=right | 2.2 km || 
|-id=780 bgcolor=#fefefe
| 457780 ||  || — || July 29, 2009 || Catalina || CSS || H || align=right data-sort-value="0.77" | 770 m || 
|-id=781 bgcolor=#E9E9E9
| 457781 ||  || — || August 15, 2009 || Kitt Peak || Spacewatch || — || align=right | 2.2 km || 
|-id=782 bgcolor=#E9E9E9
| 457782 ||  || — || July 29, 2009 || Kitt Peak || Spacewatch || — || align=right | 3.1 km || 
|-id=783 bgcolor=#E9E9E9
| 457783 ||  || — || July 28, 2009 || Catalina || CSS || — || align=right data-sort-value="0.98" | 980 m || 
|-id=784 bgcolor=#E9E9E9
| 457784 ||  || — || August 15, 2009 || La Sagra || OAM Obs. || JUN || align=right data-sort-value="0.98" | 980 m || 
|-id=785 bgcolor=#E9E9E9
| 457785 ||  || — || August 15, 2009 || Catalina || CSS || — || align=right | 1.8 km || 
|-id=786 bgcolor=#d6d6d6
| 457786 ||  || — || August 15, 2009 || Kitt Peak || Spacewatch || — || align=right | 2.4 km || 
|-id=787 bgcolor=#fefefe
| 457787 ||  || — || September 8, 2004 || Socorro || LINEAR || H || align=right data-sort-value="0.73" | 730 m || 
|-id=788 bgcolor=#d6d6d6
| 457788 ||  || — || August 16, 2009 || Kitt Peak || Spacewatch || — || align=right | 2.3 km || 
|-id=789 bgcolor=#E9E9E9
| 457789 ||  || — || August 17, 2009 || Catalina || CSS || — || align=right | 2.1 km || 
|-id=790 bgcolor=#fefefe
| 457790 ||  || — || August 19, 2009 || La Sagra || OAM Obs. || H || align=right data-sort-value="0.73" | 730 m || 
|-id=791 bgcolor=#E9E9E9
| 457791 ||  || — || August 15, 2009 || Socorro || LINEAR || ADE || align=right | 2.2 km || 
|-id=792 bgcolor=#E9E9E9
| 457792 ||  || — || August 16, 2009 || Kitt Peak || Spacewatch || HOF || align=right | 2.5 km || 
|-id=793 bgcolor=#fefefe
| 457793 ||  || — || August 19, 2009 || Kitt Peak || Spacewatch || H || align=right data-sort-value="0.56" | 560 m || 
|-id=794 bgcolor=#E9E9E9
| 457794 ||  || — || August 21, 2009 || Socorro || LINEAR || — || align=right | 3.0 km || 
|-id=795 bgcolor=#fefefe
| 457795 ||  || — || August 24, 2009 || La Sagra || OAM Obs. || H || align=right data-sort-value="0.87" | 870 m || 
|-id=796 bgcolor=#fefefe
| 457796 ||  || — || August 18, 2009 || La Sagra || OAM Obs. || H || align=right data-sort-value="0.69" | 690 m || 
|-id=797 bgcolor=#fefefe
| 457797 ||  || — || May 27, 2009 || Catalina || CSS || — || align=right | 1.4 km || 
|-id=798 bgcolor=#fefefe
| 457798 ||  || — || August 29, 2009 || Bergisch Gladbac || W. Bickel || H || align=right data-sort-value="0.72" | 720 m || 
|-id=799 bgcolor=#E9E9E9
| 457799 ||  || — || August 18, 2009 || Kitt Peak || Spacewatch || — || align=right | 1.7 km || 
|-id=800 bgcolor=#d6d6d6
| 457800 ||  || — || August 19, 2009 || Catalina || CSS || — || align=right | 3.5 km || 
|}

457801–457900 

|-bgcolor=#E9E9E9
| 457801 ||  || — || August 17, 2009 || Catalina || CSS || — || align=right | 2.2 km || 
|-id=802 bgcolor=#fefefe
| 457802 ||  || — || August 16, 2009 || Kitt Peak || Spacewatch || H || align=right data-sort-value="0.72" | 720 m || 
|-id=803 bgcolor=#E9E9E9
| 457803 ||  || — || September 11, 2009 || Catalina || CSS || — || align=right | 3.0 km || 
|-id=804 bgcolor=#fefefe
| 457804 ||  || — || September 12, 2009 || Kitt Peak || Spacewatch || — || align=right data-sort-value="0.72" | 720 m || 
|-id=805 bgcolor=#E9E9E9
| 457805 ||  || — || September 12, 2009 || Kitt Peak || Spacewatch || PAD || align=right | 1.3 km || 
|-id=806 bgcolor=#d6d6d6
| 457806 ||  || — || September 12, 2009 || Kitt Peak || Spacewatch || — || align=right | 2.4 km || 
|-id=807 bgcolor=#d6d6d6
| 457807 ||  || — || September 12, 2009 || Kitt Peak || Spacewatch || — || align=right | 2.5 km || 
|-id=808 bgcolor=#fefefe
| 457808 ||  || — || July 30, 2009 || Kitt Peak || Spacewatch || H || align=right data-sort-value="0.67" | 670 m || 
|-id=809 bgcolor=#E9E9E9
| 457809 ||  || — || September 13, 2009 || Socorro || LINEAR || — || align=right | 2.8 km || 
|-id=810 bgcolor=#d6d6d6
| 457810 ||  || — || September 15, 2009 || Mount Lemmon || Mount Lemmon Survey || — || align=right | 2.1 km || 
|-id=811 bgcolor=#d6d6d6
| 457811 ||  || — || September 14, 2009 || Kitt Peak || Spacewatch || — || align=right | 1.9 km || 
|-id=812 bgcolor=#d6d6d6
| 457812 ||  || — || September 15, 2009 || Kitt Peak || Spacewatch || — || align=right | 2.9 km || 
|-id=813 bgcolor=#d6d6d6
| 457813 ||  || — || September 15, 2009 || Kitt Peak || Spacewatch || — || align=right | 2.1 km || 
|-id=814 bgcolor=#fefefe
| 457814 ||  || — || September 15, 2009 || Kitt Peak || Spacewatch || — || align=right data-sort-value="0.77" | 770 m || 
|-id=815 bgcolor=#d6d6d6
| 457815 ||  || — || September 15, 2009 || Kitt Peak || Spacewatch || THM || align=right | 2.2 km || 
|-id=816 bgcolor=#d6d6d6
| 457816 ||  || — || September 15, 2009 || Kitt Peak || Spacewatch || LIX || align=right | 3.5 km || 
|-id=817 bgcolor=#E9E9E9
| 457817 ||  || — || September 15, 2009 || Kitt Peak || Spacewatch || GEF || align=right | 1.3 km || 
|-id=818 bgcolor=#E9E9E9
| 457818 ||  || — || September 10, 2009 || ESA OGS || ESA OGS || — || align=right | 2.0 km || 
|-id=819 bgcolor=#E9E9E9
| 457819 ||  || — || September 16, 2009 || Mount Lemmon || Mount Lemmon Survey || — || align=right | 2.0 km || 
|-id=820 bgcolor=#E9E9E9
| 457820 ||  || — || April 18, 2007 || Mount Lemmon || Mount Lemmon Survey || — || align=right | 2.5 km || 
|-id=821 bgcolor=#d6d6d6
| 457821 ||  || — || September 16, 2009 || Kitt Peak || Spacewatch || — || align=right | 3.2 km || 
|-id=822 bgcolor=#d6d6d6
| 457822 ||  || — || September 16, 2009 || Kitt Peak || Spacewatch || — || align=right | 2.4 km || 
|-id=823 bgcolor=#d6d6d6
| 457823 ||  || — || September 17, 2009 || Kitt Peak || Spacewatch || — || align=right | 1.5 km || 
|-id=824 bgcolor=#d6d6d6
| 457824 ||  || — || September 17, 2009 || Kitt Peak || Spacewatch || — || align=right | 2.6 km || 
|-id=825 bgcolor=#E9E9E9
| 457825 ||  || — || September 17, 2009 || Kitt Peak || Spacewatch || — || align=right | 1.4 km || 
|-id=826 bgcolor=#d6d6d6
| 457826 ||  || — || September 17, 2009 || Kitt Peak || Spacewatch || — || align=right | 2.2 km || 
|-id=827 bgcolor=#d6d6d6
| 457827 ||  || — || September 17, 2009 || Kitt Peak || Spacewatch || — || align=right | 2.6 km || 
|-id=828 bgcolor=#d6d6d6
| 457828 ||  || — || September 17, 2009 || Mount Lemmon || Mount Lemmon Survey || — || align=right | 1.9 km || 
|-id=829 bgcolor=#d6d6d6
| 457829 ||  || — || August 20, 2009 || Kitt Peak || Spacewatch || — || align=right | 2.0 km || 
|-id=830 bgcolor=#d6d6d6
| 457830 ||  || — || August 27, 2009 || Kitt Peak || Spacewatch || — || align=right | 2.1 km || 
|-id=831 bgcolor=#E9E9E9
| 457831 ||  || — || September 17, 2009 || Kitt Peak || Spacewatch || — || align=right | 2.2 km || 
|-id=832 bgcolor=#d6d6d6
| 457832 ||  || — || September 17, 2009 || Kitt Peak || Spacewatch || — || align=right | 2.6 km || 
|-id=833 bgcolor=#E9E9E9
| 457833 ||  || — || September 18, 2009 || Kitt Peak || Spacewatch || — || align=right | 1.1 km || 
|-id=834 bgcolor=#d6d6d6
| 457834 ||  || — || September 18, 2009 || Kitt Peak || Spacewatch || — || align=right | 1.8 km || 
|-id=835 bgcolor=#d6d6d6
| 457835 ||  || — || September 18, 2009 || Mount Lemmon || Mount Lemmon Survey || — || align=right | 2.1 km || 
|-id=836 bgcolor=#d6d6d6
| 457836 ||  || — || September 18, 2009 || Mount Lemmon || Mount Lemmon Survey || — || align=right | 2.1 km || 
|-id=837 bgcolor=#d6d6d6
| 457837 ||  || — || September 18, 2009 || Mount Lemmon || Mount Lemmon Survey || — || align=right | 2.7 km || 
|-id=838 bgcolor=#d6d6d6
| 457838 ||  || — || September 20, 2009 || Mount Lemmon || Mount Lemmon Survey || — || align=right | 3.2 km || 
|-id=839 bgcolor=#d6d6d6
| 457839 ||  || — || September 21, 2009 || Mount Lemmon || Mount Lemmon Survey || — || align=right | 1.7 km || 
|-id=840 bgcolor=#E9E9E9
| 457840 ||  || — || September 16, 2009 || Mount Lemmon || Mount Lemmon Survey || — || align=right | 2.5 km || 
|-id=841 bgcolor=#E9E9E9
| 457841 ||  || — || September 18, 2009 || Kitt Peak || Spacewatch || MRX || align=right | 1.0 km || 
|-id=842 bgcolor=#E9E9E9
| 457842 ||  || — || October 24, 2005 || Kitt Peak || Spacewatch || ADE || align=right | 2.2 km || 
|-id=843 bgcolor=#d6d6d6
| 457843 ||  || — || September 18, 2009 || Kitt Peak || Spacewatch || — || align=right | 1.9 km || 
|-id=844 bgcolor=#E9E9E9
| 457844 ||  || — || September 11, 2004 || Kitt Peak || Spacewatch || — || align=right | 2.4 km || 
|-id=845 bgcolor=#d6d6d6
| 457845 ||  || — || September 18, 2009 || Kitt Peak || Spacewatch || — || align=right | 2.4 km || 
|-id=846 bgcolor=#d6d6d6
| 457846 ||  || — || September 18, 2009 || Kitt Peak || Spacewatch || — || align=right | 2.5 km || 
|-id=847 bgcolor=#d6d6d6
| 457847 ||  || — || September 15, 2009 || Kitt Peak || Spacewatch || — || align=right | 2.0 km || 
|-id=848 bgcolor=#E9E9E9
| 457848 ||  || — || September 19, 2009 || Mount Lemmon || Mount Lemmon Survey || — || align=right | 1.7 km || 
|-id=849 bgcolor=#d6d6d6
| 457849 ||  || — || September 20, 2009 || Kitt Peak || Spacewatch || — || align=right | 2.6 km || 
|-id=850 bgcolor=#d6d6d6
| 457850 ||  || — || September 20, 2009 || Kitt Peak || Spacewatch || KOR || align=right | 1.1 km || 
|-id=851 bgcolor=#E9E9E9
| 457851 ||  || — || March 10, 2008 || Kitt Peak || Spacewatch || — || align=right | 1.5 km || 
|-id=852 bgcolor=#d6d6d6
| 457852 ||  || — || August 28, 2009 || Kitt Peak || Spacewatch || — || align=right | 1.7 km || 
|-id=853 bgcolor=#d6d6d6
| 457853 ||  || — || September 17, 2009 || Catalina || CSS || — || align=right | 2.0 km || 
|-id=854 bgcolor=#d6d6d6
| 457854 ||  || — || September 17, 2009 || Catalina || CSS || — || align=right | 3.2 km || 
|-id=855 bgcolor=#d6d6d6
| 457855 ||  || — || September 19, 2009 || Kitt Peak || Spacewatch || — || align=right | 2.1 km || 
|-id=856 bgcolor=#E9E9E9
| 457856 ||  || — || September 18, 2009 || Catalina || CSS ||  || align=right | 2.7 km || 
|-id=857 bgcolor=#fefefe
| 457857 ||  || — || September 19, 2009 || Kitt Peak || Spacewatch || H || align=right data-sort-value="0.74" | 740 m || 
|-id=858 bgcolor=#E9E9E9
| 457858 ||  || — || February 28, 2008 || Kitt Peak || Spacewatch || — || align=right | 1.3 km || 
|-id=859 bgcolor=#E9E9E9
| 457859 ||  || — || September 22, 2009 || Kitt Peak || Spacewatch || — || align=right | 2.3 km || 
|-id=860 bgcolor=#d6d6d6
| 457860 ||  || — || September 22, 2009 || Kitt Peak || Spacewatch || — || align=right | 2.2 km || 
|-id=861 bgcolor=#E9E9E9
| 457861 ||  || — || December 2, 2005 || Mount Lemmon || Mount Lemmon Survey || AGN || align=right | 1.0 km || 
|-id=862 bgcolor=#d6d6d6
| 457862 ||  || — || September 22, 2009 || Kitt Peak || Spacewatch || — || align=right | 3.1 km || 
|-id=863 bgcolor=#d6d6d6
| 457863 ||  || — || October 4, 2004 || Kitt Peak || Spacewatch || KOR || align=right | 1.2 km || 
|-id=864 bgcolor=#d6d6d6
| 457864 ||  || — || September 24, 2009 || Kitt Peak || Spacewatch || — || align=right | 3.0 km || 
|-id=865 bgcolor=#d6d6d6
| 457865 ||  || — || September 15, 2009 || Kitt Peak || Spacewatch || — || align=right | 2.0 km || 
|-id=866 bgcolor=#d6d6d6
| 457866 ||  || — || September 24, 2009 || Mount Lemmon || Mount Lemmon Survey || EOS || align=right | 1.8 km || 
|-id=867 bgcolor=#E9E9E9
| 457867 ||  || — || August 17, 2009 || Kitt Peak || Spacewatch || — || align=right | 1.8 km || 
|-id=868 bgcolor=#E9E9E9
| 457868 ||  || — || September 25, 2009 || Mount Lemmon || Mount Lemmon Survey || GEF || align=right | 1.3 km || 
|-id=869 bgcolor=#d6d6d6
| 457869 ||  || — || September 18, 2009 || Catalina || CSS || — || align=right | 2.8 km || 
|-id=870 bgcolor=#d6d6d6
| 457870 ||  || — || September 15, 2009 || Catalina || CSS || — || align=right | 3.0 km || 
|-id=871 bgcolor=#d6d6d6
| 457871 ||  || — || September 16, 2009 || Kitt Peak || Spacewatch || — || align=right | 2.3 km || 
|-id=872 bgcolor=#E9E9E9
| 457872 ||  || — || April 7, 2003 || Kitt Peak || Spacewatch || — || align=right | 2.2 km || 
|-id=873 bgcolor=#d6d6d6
| 457873 ||  || — || September 16, 2009 || Kitt Peak || Spacewatch || — || align=right | 1.8 km || 
|-id=874 bgcolor=#fefefe
| 457874 ||  || — || September 22, 2009 || Kitt Peak || Spacewatch || H || align=right data-sort-value="0.76" | 760 m || 
|-id=875 bgcolor=#E9E9E9
| 457875 ||  || — || February 21, 2007 || Kitt Peak || Spacewatch || — || align=right | 2.6 km || 
|-id=876 bgcolor=#E9E9E9
| 457876 ||  || — || September 17, 2009 || Kitt Peak || Spacewatch || HOF || align=right | 2.4 km || 
|-id=877 bgcolor=#d6d6d6
| 457877 ||  || — || September 25, 2009 || Kitt Peak || Spacewatch || — || align=right | 1.9 km || 
|-id=878 bgcolor=#d6d6d6
| 457878 ||  || — || September 17, 2009 || Kitt Peak || Spacewatch || — || align=right | 2.2 km || 
|-id=879 bgcolor=#d6d6d6
| 457879 ||  || — || September 17, 2009 || Kitt Peak || Spacewatch || — || align=right | 2.1 km || 
|-id=880 bgcolor=#E9E9E9
| 457880 ||  || — || September 16, 2009 || Mount Lemmon || Mount Lemmon Survey || — || align=right | 2.1 km || 
|-id=881 bgcolor=#E9E9E9
| 457881 ||  || — || August 28, 2009 || Kitt Peak || Spacewatch || — || align=right | 1.9 km || 
|-id=882 bgcolor=#d6d6d6
| 457882 ||  || — || September 25, 2009 || Catalina || CSS || — || align=right | 3.2 km || 
|-id=883 bgcolor=#d6d6d6
| 457883 ||  || — || September 17, 2009 || Mount Lemmon || Mount Lemmon Survey || — || align=right | 2.8 km || 
|-id=884 bgcolor=#d6d6d6
| 457884 ||  || — || September 23, 2009 || Mount Lemmon || Mount Lemmon Survey || TIR || align=right | 2.4 km || 
|-id=885 bgcolor=#d6d6d6
| 457885 ||  || — || September 18, 2009 || Kitt Peak || Spacewatch || — || align=right | 2.8 km || 
|-id=886 bgcolor=#d6d6d6
| 457886 ||  || — || September 28, 2009 || Mount Lemmon || Mount Lemmon Survey || — || align=right | 1.7 km || 
|-id=887 bgcolor=#d6d6d6
| 457887 ||  || — || September 22, 2009 || Mount Lemmon || Mount Lemmon Survey || — || align=right | 2.0 km || 
|-id=888 bgcolor=#d6d6d6
| 457888 ||  || — || September 21, 2009 || Mount Lemmon || Mount Lemmon Survey || — || align=right | 2.4 km || 
|-id=889 bgcolor=#d6d6d6
| 457889 ||  || — || September 21, 2009 || Mount Lemmon || Mount Lemmon Survey || — || align=right | 2.9 km || 
|-id=890 bgcolor=#d6d6d6
| 457890 ||  || — || September 29, 2009 || Mount Lemmon || Mount Lemmon Survey || EOS || align=right | 1.5 km || 
|-id=891 bgcolor=#d6d6d6
| 457891 ||  || — || September 12, 2009 || Kitt Peak || Spacewatch || — || align=right | 2.4 km || 
|-id=892 bgcolor=#d6d6d6
| 457892 ||  || — || October 11, 2009 || Mount Lemmon || Mount Lemmon Survey || — || align=right | 2.2 km || 
|-id=893 bgcolor=#d6d6d6
| 457893 ||  || — || October 11, 2009 || Mount Lemmon || Mount Lemmon Survey || critical || align=right | 1.8 km || 
|-id=894 bgcolor=#fefefe
| 457894 ||  || — || October 14, 2009 || Goodricke-Pigott || R. A. Tucker || H || align=right data-sort-value="0.81" | 810 m || 
|-id=895 bgcolor=#fefefe
| 457895 ||  || — || October 14, 2009 || Mount Lemmon || Mount Lemmon Survey || H || align=right data-sort-value="0.83" | 830 m || 
|-id=896 bgcolor=#E9E9E9
| 457896 ||  || — || December 24, 2005 || Kitt Peak || Spacewatch || AGN || align=right | 1.2 km || 
|-id=897 bgcolor=#d6d6d6
| 457897 ||  || — || September 28, 2009 || Mount Lemmon || Mount Lemmon Survey || — || align=right | 4.5 km || 
|-id=898 bgcolor=#d6d6d6
| 457898 ||  || — || October 13, 2009 || Socorro || LINEAR || — || align=right | 1.8 km || 
|-id=899 bgcolor=#d6d6d6
| 457899 ||  || — || September 20, 2009 || Kitt Peak || Spacewatch || — || align=right | 3.1 km || 
|-id=900 bgcolor=#fefefe
| 457900 ||  || — || September 21, 2009 || Kitt Peak || Spacewatch || — || align=right data-sort-value="0.94" | 940 m || 
|}

457901–458000 

|-bgcolor=#d6d6d6
| 457901 ||  || — || October 11, 2009 || Mount Lemmon || Mount Lemmon Survey || — || align=right | 2.6 km || 
|-id=902 bgcolor=#d6d6d6
| 457902 ||  || — || October 1, 2009 || Mount Lemmon || Mount Lemmon Survey || Tj (2.99) || align=right | 3.6 km || 
|-id=903 bgcolor=#d6d6d6
| 457903 ||  || — || October 14, 2009 || Mount Lemmon || Mount Lemmon Survey || — || align=right | 2.9 km || 
|-id=904 bgcolor=#d6d6d6
| 457904 ||  || — || September 17, 2009 || Kitt Peak || Spacewatch || EOS || align=right | 1.7 km || 
|-id=905 bgcolor=#E9E9E9
| 457905 ||  || — || October 24, 2005 || Kitt Peak || Spacewatch || — || align=right | 1.2 km || 
|-id=906 bgcolor=#E9E9E9
| 457906 ||  || — || November 26, 2005 || Mount Lemmon || Mount Lemmon Survey || AGN || align=right | 1.0 km || 
|-id=907 bgcolor=#d6d6d6
| 457907 ||  || — || September 18, 2009 || Kitt Peak || Spacewatch || THMcritical || align=right | 1.7 km || 
|-id=908 bgcolor=#d6d6d6
| 457908 ||  || — || October 1, 2009 || Mount Lemmon || Mount Lemmon Survey || — || align=right | 3.6 km || 
|-id=909 bgcolor=#E9E9E9
| 457909 ||  || — || September 28, 2009 || Mount Lemmon || Mount Lemmon Survey || — || align=right | 2.0 km || 
|-id=910 bgcolor=#d6d6d6
| 457910 ||  || — || October 18, 2009 || La Sagra || OAM Obs. || — || align=right | 3.9 km || 
|-id=911 bgcolor=#E9E9E9
| 457911 ||  || — || October 19, 2009 || Mayhill || A. Lowe || — || align=right | 2.6 km || 
|-id=912 bgcolor=#FFC2E0
| 457912 ||  || — || October 23, 2009 || Socorro || LINEAR || APOcritical || align=right data-sort-value="0.43" | 430 m || 
|-id=913 bgcolor=#E9E9E9
| 457913 ||  || — || October 21, 2009 || Mount Lemmon || Mount Lemmon Survey || HOF || align=right | 2.5 km || 
|-id=914 bgcolor=#d6d6d6
| 457914 ||  || — || September 22, 2009 || Mount Lemmon || Mount Lemmon Survey || — || align=right | 3.8 km || 
|-id=915 bgcolor=#d6d6d6
| 457915 ||  || — || October 18, 2009 || Mount Lemmon || Mount Lemmon Survey || EOS || align=right | 1.8 km || 
|-id=916 bgcolor=#d6d6d6
| 457916 ||  || — || October 21, 2009 || Mount Lemmon || Mount Lemmon Survey || LIX || align=right | 3.7 km || 
|-id=917 bgcolor=#d6d6d6
| 457917 ||  || — || September 18, 2009 || Kitt Peak || Spacewatch || — || align=right | 1.8 km || 
|-id=918 bgcolor=#d6d6d6
| 457918 ||  || — || September 22, 2009 || Mount Lemmon || Mount Lemmon Survey || EOS || align=right | 1.9 km || 
|-id=919 bgcolor=#d6d6d6
| 457919 ||  || — || October 18, 2009 || Mount Lemmon || Mount Lemmon Survey || — || align=right | 1.9 km || 
|-id=920 bgcolor=#d6d6d6
| 457920 ||  || — || October 18, 2009 || Kitt Peak || Spacewatch || — || align=right | 2.2 km || 
|-id=921 bgcolor=#d6d6d6
| 457921 ||  || — || September 16, 2009 || Mount Lemmon || Mount Lemmon Survey || — || align=right | 2.9 km || 
|-id=922 bgcolor=#d6d6d6
| 457922 ||  || — || September 24, 2009 || Kitt Peak || Spacewatch || — || align=right | 2.2 km || 
|-id=923 bgcolor=#d6d6d6
| 457923 ||  || — || October 22, 2009 || Mount Lemmon || Mount Lemmon Survey || EOS || align=right | 2.0 km || 
|-id=924 bgcolor=#d6d6d6
| 457924 ||  || — || October 23, 2009 || Mount Lemmon || Mount Lemmon Survey || — || align=right | 2.0 km || 
|-id=925 bgcolor=#fefefe
| 457925 ||  || — || October 26, 2009 || La Sagra || OAM Obs. || H || align=right data-sort-value="0.91" | 910 m || 
|-id=926 bgcolor=#d6d6d6
| 457926 ||  || — || October 17, 2009 || Mount Lemmon || Mount Lemmon Survey || — || align=right | 4.8 km || 
|-id=927 bgcolor=#d6d6d6
| 457927 ||  || — || October 23, 2009 || Mount Lemmon || Mount Lemmon Survey || — || align=right | 2.4 km || 
|-id=928 bgcolor=#d6d6d6
| 457928 ||  || — || September 20, 2009 || Mount Lemmon || Mount Lemmon Survey || — || align=right | 3.7 km || 
|-id=929 bgcolor=#d6d6d6
| 457929 ||  || — || October 23, 2009 || Kitt Peak || Spacewatch || — || align=right | 3.1 km || 
|-id=930 bgcolor=#d6d6d6
| 457930 ||  || — || October 4, 2004 || Kitt Peak || Spacewatch || — || align=right | 2.0 km || 
|-id=931 bgcolor=#d6d6d6
| 457931 ||  || — || October 26, 2009 || Mount Lemmon || Mount Lemmon Survey || — || align=right | 3.0 km || 
|-id=932 bgcolor=#d6d6d6
| 457932 ||  || — || October 25, 2009 || Kitt Peak || Spacewatch || — || align=right | 2.6 km || 
|-id=933 bgcolor=#d6d6d6
| 457933 ||  || — || October 21, 2009 || Catalina || CSS || — || align=right | 2.5 km || 
|-id=934 bgcolor=#d6d6d6
| 457934 ||  || — || September 20, 2009 || Catalina || CSS || — || align=right | 3.5 km || 
|-id=935 bgcolor=#d6d6d6
| 457935 ||  || — || October 18, 2009 || Mount Lemmon || Mount Lemmon Survey || — || align=right | 1.7 km || 
|-id=936 bgcolor=#d6d6d6
| 457936 ||  || — || October 23, 2009 || Mount Lemmon || Mount Lemmon Survey || — || align=right | 1.9 km || 
|-id=937 bgcolor=#d6d6d6
| 457937 ||  || — || October 17, 2009 || Catalina || CSS || TIR || align=right | 2.5 km || 
|-id=938 bgcolor=#d6d6d6
| 457938 ||  || — || October 26, 2009 || Kitt Peak || Spacewatch || EOS || align=right | 1.9 km || 
|-id=939 bgcolor=#d6d6d6
| 457939 ||  || — || November 9, 2009 || Tzec Maun || D. Chestnov, A. Novichonok || ELF || align=right | 3.9 km || 
|-id=940 bgcolor=#d6d6d6
| 457940 ||  || — || November 9, 2009 || Socorro || LINEAR || — || align=right | 3.6 km || 
|-id=941 bgcolor=#d6d6d6
| 457941 ||  || — || November 9, 2009 || Socorro || LINEAR || — || align=right | 2.9 km || 
|-id=942 bgcolor=#d6d6d6
| 457942 ||  || — || November 8, 2009 || Mount Lemmon || Mount Lemmon Survey || — || align=right | 2.1 km || 
|-id=943 bgcolor=#d6d6d6
| 457943 ||  || — || October 24, 2009 || Kitt Peak || Spacewatch || EOS || align=right | 1.9 km || 
|-id=944 bgcolor=#d6d6d6
| 457944 ||  || — || November 8, 2009 || Mount Lemmon || Mount Lemmon Survey || — || align=right | 2.0 km || 
|-id=945 bgcolor=#d6d6d6
| 457945 ||  || — || October 24, 2009 || Catalina || CSS || — || align=right | 3.6 km || 
|-id=946 bgcolor=#d6d6d6
| 457946 ||  || — || October 26, 2009 || Kitt Peak || Spacewatch || EOS || align=right | 1.9 km || 
|-id=947 bgcolor=#d6d6d6
| 457947 ||  || — || November 9, 2009 || Mount Lemmon || Mount Lemmon Survey || — || align=right | 2.4 km || 
|-id=948 bgcolor=#d6d6d6
| 457948 ||  || — || November 9, 2009 || Mount Lemmon || Mount Lemmon Survey || — || align=right | 3.4 km || 
|-id=949 bgcolor=#d6d6d6
| 457949 ||  || — || October 22, 2009 || Mount Lemmon || Mount Lemmon Survey || — || align=right | 3.9 km || 
|-id=950 bgcolor=#d6d6d6
| 457950 ||  || — || October 22, 2009 || Mount Lemmon || Mount Lemmon Survey || — || align=right | 3.4 km || 
|-id=951 bgcolor=#d6d6d6
| 457951 ||  || — || October 30, 2009 || Mount Lemmon || Mount Lemmon Survey || — || align=right | 4.1 km || 
|-id=952 bgcolor=#d6d6d6
| 457952 ||  || — || September 21, 2009 || Mount Lemmon || Mount Lemmon Survey || — || align=right | 2.5 km || 
|-id=953 bgcolor=#d6d6d6
| 457953 ||  || — || October 18, 2009 || Mount Lemmon || Mount Lemmon Survey || EOS || align=right | 1.7 km || 
|-id=954 bgcolor=#E9E9E9
| 457954 ||  || — || October 24, 2009 || Kitt Peak || Spacewatch || — || align=right | 1.8 km || 
|-id=955 bgcolor=#E9E9E9
| 457955 ||  || — || October 24, 2009 || Kitt Peak || Spacewatch || — || align=right | 1.8 km || 
|-id=956 bgcolor=#d6d6d6
| 457956 ||  || — || November 8, 2009 || Kitt Peak || Spacewatch || — || align=right | 1.7 km || 
|-id=957 bgcolor=#d6d6d6
| 457957 ||  || — || November 9, 2009 || Kitt Peak || Spacewatch || EOS || align=right | 1.8 km || 
|-id=958 bgcolor=#d6d6d6
| 457958 ||  || — || October 22, 2009 || Mount Lemmon || Mount Lemmon Survey || — || align=right | 2.8 km || 
|-id=959 bgcolor=#d6d6d6
| 457959 ||  || — || November 9, 2009 || Kitt Peak || Spacewatch || — || align=right | 4.7 km || 
|-id=960 bgcolor=#d6d6d6
| 457960 ||  || — || September 20, 2009 || Mount Lemmon || Mount Lemmon Survey || — || align=right | 3.9 km || 
|-id=961 bgcolor=#d6d6d6
| 457961 ||  || — || November 9, 2009 || Mount Lemmon || Mount Lemmon Survey || — || align=right | 1.9 km || 
|-id=962 bgcolor=#d6d6d6
| 457962 ||  || — || October 17, 2009 || Mount Lemmon || Mount Lemmon Survey || — || align=right | 2.3 km || 
|-id=963 bgcolor=#d6d6d6
| 457963 ||  || — || November 9, 2009 || Catalina || CSS || — || align=right | 2.1 km || 
|-id=964 bgcolor=#E9E9E9
| 457964 ||  || — || November 10, 2009 || Catalina || CSS || — || align=right | 3.2 km || 
|-id=965 bgcolor=#d6d6d6
| 457965 ||  || — || September 25, 2009 || Catalina || CSS || — || align=right | 4.2 km || 
|-id=966 bgcolor=#d6d6d6
| 457966 ||  || — || October 22, 2009 || Mount Lemmon || Mount Lemmon Survey || — || align=right | 3.5 km || 
|-id=967 bgcolor=#d6d6d6
| 457967 ||  || — || November 9, 2009 || Kitt Peak || Spacewatch || — || align=right | 2.8 km || 
|-id=968 bgcolor=#d6d6d6
| 457968 ||  || — || September 20, 2009 || Mount Lemmon || Mount Lemmon Survey || — || align=right | 2.2 km || 
|-id=969 bgcolor=#d6d6d6
| 457969 ||  || — || October 26, 2009 || Mount Lemmon || Mount Lemmon Survey || EOS || align=right | 1.7 km || 
|-id=970 bgcolor=#d6d6d6
| 457970 ||  || — || November 10, 2009 || Kitt Peak || Spacewatch || — || align=right | 3.0 km || 
|-id=971 bgcolor=#d6d6d6
| 457971 ||  || — || September 27, 2009 || Kitt Peak || Spacewatch || — || align=right | 2.4 km || 
|-id=972 bgcolor=#d6d6d6
| 457972 ||  || — || November 9, 2009 || Kitt Peak || Spacewatch || — || align=right | 1.9 km || 
|-id=973 bgcolor=#d6d6d6
| 457973 ||  || — || November 9, 2009 || Kitt Peak || Spacewatch || — || align=right | 3.8 km || 
|-id=974 bgcolor=#d6d6d6
| 457974 ||  || — || September 21, 2009 || Mount Lemmon || Mount Lemmon Survey || — || align=right | 3.1 km || 
|-id=975 bgcolor=#d6d6d6
| 457975 ||  || — || September 21, 2009 || Mount Lemmon || Mount Lemmon Survey || LIX || align=right | 3.6 km || 
|-id=976 bgcolor=#d6d6d6
| 457976 ||  || — || October 18, 2009 || Socorro || LINEAR || — || align=right | 4.1 km || 
|-id=977 bgcolor=#d6d6d6
| 457977 ||  || — || November 8, 2009 || Catalina || CSS || LIX || align=right | 4.2 km || 
|-id=978 bgcolor=#d6d6d6
| 457978 ||  || — || October 30, 2009 || Mount Lemmon || Mount Lemmon Survey || EOS || align=right | 2.6 km || 
|-id=979 bgcolor=#fefefe
| 457979 ||  || — || May 27, 2008 || Kitt Peak || Spacewatch || H || align=right data-sort-value="0.56" | 560 m || 
|-id=980 bgcolor=#d6d6d6
| 457980 ||  || — || November 10, 2009 || Mount Lemmon || Mount Lemmon Survey || — || align=right | 3.5 km || 
|-id=981 bgcolor=#d6d6d6
| 457981 ||  || — || October 14, 2009 || Mount Lemmon || Mount Lemmon Survey || — || align=right | 3.0 km || 
|-id=982 bgcolor=#d6d6d6
| 457982 ||  || — || November 8, 2009 || Kitt Peak || Spacewatch || — || align=right | 3.1 km || 
|-id=983 bgcolor=#d6d6d6
| 457983 ||  || — || November 9, 2009 || Kitt Peak || Spacewatch || — || align=right | 2.8 km || 
|-id=984 bgcolor=#d6d6d6
| 457984 ||  || — || November 10, 2009 || Kitt Peak || Spacewatch || — || align=right | 3.8 km || 
|-id=985 bgcolor=#d6d6d6
| 457985 ||  || — || November 16, 2009 || Mount Lemmon || Mount Lemmon Survey || — || align=right | 2.1 km || 
|-id=986 bgcolor=#d6d6d6
| 457986 ||  || — || November 19, 2009 || Socorro || LINEAR || — || align=right | 3.1 km || 
|-id=987 bgcolor=#fefefe
| 457987 ||  || — || November 19, 2009 || Socorro || LINEAR || — || align=right data-sort-value="0.89" | 890 m || 
|-id=988 bgcolor=#d6d6d6
| 457988 ||  || — || November 19, 2009 || Kitt Peak || Spacewatch || — || align=right | 4.6 km || 
|-id=989 bgcolor=#d6d6d6
| 457989 ||  || — || November 17, 2009 || Kitt Peak || Spacewatch || — || align=right | 2.5 km || 
|-id=990 bgcolor=#d6d6d6
| 457990 ||  || — || November 8, 2009 || Kitt Peak || Spacewatch || THM || align=right | 2.1 km || 
|-id=991 bgcolor=#d6d6d6
| 457991 ||  || — || November 8, 2009 || Kitt Peak || Spacewatch || — || align=right | 3.1 km || 
|-id=992 bgcolor=#d6d6d6
| 457992 ||  || — || November 16, 2009 || Kitt Peak || Spacewatch || — || align=right | 2.6 km || 
|-id=993 bgcolor=#d6d6d6
| 457993 ||  || — || November 17, 2009 || Kitt Peak || Spacewatch || — || align=right | 1.9 km || 
|-id=994 bgcolor=#d6d6d6
| 457994 ||  || — || November 17, 2009 || Kitt Peak || Spacewatch || — || align=right | 1.9 km || 
|-id=995 bgcolor=#d6d6d6
| 457995 ||  || — || November 17, 2009 || Kitt Peak || Spacewatch || — || align=right | 2.8 km || 
|-id=996 bgcolor=#d6d6d6
| 457996 ||  || — || November 17, 2009 || Mount Lemmon || Mount Lemmon Survey || EOS || align=right | 1.6 km || 
|-id=997 bgcolor=#d6d6d6
| 457997 ||  || — || November 16, 2009 || Mount Lemmon || Mount Lemmon Survey || — || align=right | 3.0 km || 
|-id=998 bgcolor=#d6d6d6
| 457998 ||  || — || November 16, 2009 || Mount Lemmon || Mount Lemmon Survey || — || align=right | 3.8 km || 
|-id=999 bgcolor=#d6d6d6
| 457999 ||  || — || November 17, 2009 || Kitt Peak || Spacewatch || — || align=right | 2.0 km || 
|-id=000 bgcolor=#d6d6d6
| 458000 ||  || — || October 23, 2009 || Mount Lemmon || Mount Lemmon Survey || — || align=right | 2.5 km || 
|}

References

External links 
 Discovery Circumstances: Numbered Minor Planets (455001)–(460000) (IAU Minor Planet Center)

0457